= Thomas J. Flaherty =

Irish police officer (born 1963)

Thomas J. Flaherty (born 1963) was an Irish policeman with Garda Síochána (22405G) and a recipient of the Scott Medal.

== Background ==
A native of Indreabhán, Flaherty was awarded the Scott Medal for his actions during an incident on 31 March 1994.

== Incident at Galway Docks ==
On mobile patrol at night, Madden was alerted that a woman had fallen into the city docks.

"When Flaherty arrived at the scene minutes later it was to see the distressed woman lose her grip on the lifebuoy she had been clutching and sink underwater. Pulling the clothing from his upper body Garda Flaherty dived off the dock - a height of fifteen feet - and plunted into thirty feet of freezing water. he quickly found the woman and raised her head above the surface. With the help of a lifebuoy thrown by his colleagues he swam with his charge a distance of some sixty yards until they reached the dock wall. Although dazed and barely conscious when lifted from the water, the woman later fully recovered from her experience."

Flaherty was awarded the Scott Bronze Medal on 15 February 1996 by Minister for Justice, Nora Owen.

== See also ==
- Yvonne Burke (Garda)
- Brian Connaughton
- Joseph Scott
- Deaths of Henry Byrne and John Morley (1980)
- Death of Jerry McCabe (1996)
