= Peter P. Canavan =

Irish police officer (born 1949)

- Born: 1949 (age 76–77); Kilkerrin, County Galway, Ireland
- Known for: Recipient of the Scott Medal for Bravery
- Police career
- Country: Garda Síochána
- Allegiance: Ireland
- Service years: 1969
- Status: Retired
- Awards: Scott Medal (Bronze)
- Other work: Farmer

Peter P. Canavan (born 1949) is an Irish policeman with the Garda Síochána, notable as a recipient of the Scott Medal.

== Early life ==
Canavan was a native of Kilkerrin, County Galway, and prior to joining the police force was a farmer.

== Garda career ==
Canavan joined the Garda Síochána on 12 March 1969.

=== Rathmines post office raid ===
Canavan was one of five Gardaí awarded the Scott Medal in recognition of bravery while responding to an armed raid at Rathmines post office, Dublin, on 10 August 1979. Shots were exchanged during a high-speed chase on busy streets, while Canavan reported the incident to Garda Communications Centre at Dublin Castle. The raiders were eventually cornered and after further exchanges of shots, surrendered. The sum of £20,000 stolen in the robbery was recovered.

Gardaí Michael P. Grenville, James Fagan, Peter P. Canavan, Michael Kennedy, and John K. Mullins, were all presented with the Scott Medal at Templemore in 1980.

== See also ==
- Yvonne Burke (Garda)
- Brian Connaughton
- Michael J. Reynolds
- Joseph Scott
- Deaths of Henry Byrne and John Morley (1980)
- Death of Jerry McCabe (1996)
