= Vincent Nolan =

Irish police officer

- Born: Matthew J.V. Nolan; 27 August 1936; The Square, Ardrahan, County Galway
- Died: January 25, 1980 (aged 43)
- Occupations: Garda (Garda Síochána), former boiler attendant
- Awards: Scott Bronze Medal (1960)

Vincent Nolan (baptised Matthew J.V. Nolan), Garda Síochána and recipient of the Scott Medal, 27 August 1936 – 25 January 1980.

== Background ==
Nolan was born at The Square, Ardrahan, County Galway. He joined the force on 24 January 1958, previously been a boiler attendant.

== Incident on North Circular Road ==
Early in the morning of 17 December 1958, Gardas John B. Moynihan, Thomas J. Slattery and Nolan were en route to their beats when they became aware of heavy smoke from the chimney of 603 North Circular Road, Dublin. Garda Slattery called the fire brigade while Gardas Moynihan and Nolan woke the occupants of 603.

Moynihan saved the lives of a five-year-old child, an infant, and an adult man, and had to jump for his life to escape the flames. Slattery entered the house and guided a woman and child from the flames; re-entering, he rescued a teenage boy.

Garda Nolan was meanwhile engaged in trying to locate a woman said to be asleep in the basement. By the time he located her the room was filled with very dense smoke. He brought her to safety just as the roof above them collapsed in flames. All the occupants recovered from the ordeal.

All three Gardaí received Scott Bronze Medals from Minister for Justice, Oscar Traynor, in May 1960.

== See also ==
- Yvonne Burke (Garda)
- Brian Connaughton (Scott Medal recipient)
- Joseph Scott (police officer)
- Murder of Henry Byrne and John Morley (1980)
- Killing of Jerry McCabe (1996)
