= Thomas Joseph Tormey =

Irish policeman (born 1943)

- Born: 1943 (age 82–83)
- Police career
- Department: Garda Síochána
- Awards: Scott Medal

Thomas J. Tormey, Garda Síochána 14986A and recipient of the Scott Medal, was born in 1943.

== Incident at Ballymote ==
A native of Ballinasloe, Tormey was awarded the Scott Medal for his actions during an incident on 30 May 1978.

At noon on the day in question, Garda Tormey and Garda Thomas Lavin arrived at the scene of a house fire on Lord Edward Street in Ballymote.

'The sole elderly occupant was in bed in the upstairs part of the house where the fire was blazing with particular intensity. Gardan Lavin and a civilian made an initial attempt to rescue the trapped woman but they were driven back by the intense heat and smoke. A similar attempt by Garda Tormey was also in vain. Tormey tried again, this time crawling up the stairs on his hands and knees. Reaching the bedroom he saw the woman lying on the floor and clearly still alive. He managed to drag her into the corridor but once there was momentarily confused by the choking smoke and almost-unbearable heat. A voice from the stairs enabled him to regain his sense of direction and he carried the woman down to safety. Sadly, she died later that evening."

Tormey was awarded the Scott Silver Medal in June 1979 by Justice Minister of State, David Andrews. He retired in 1992.

== See also ==
- Yvonne Burke (Garda)
- Brian Connaughton
- Michael J. Reynolds
- Joseph Scott
- Deaths of Henry Byrne and John Morley (1980)
- Death of Jerry McCabe (1996)
