= John M. G. Cosgrove =

Irish police officer

John M.G. Cosgrove, Garda Síochána 17458H and recipient of the Scott Medal, born 1949.

Cosgrove is a native of Clifden, County Galway. He became a member of the Gardaí on 25 June 1969.

== Incident at Mallow Road ==
On attachment to Cork's Mallow Road Station on plainclothes duty, Cosgrove approached two youths acting suspiciously, who ran off. While in pursuit, Cosgrove seized one of the youths only to see the other come back pointing a revolver, demanding he set free his friend.

"Cosgrove maintained his grip on his prisoner, but suddenly the boy dropped onto one knee exposing the Guard to the line of fire. The armed youth then fired at point blank range hitting Cosgrove in the right shoulder. The two then made good their escape but were later apprehended. Garda Cosgrove, left for dead by the youths, later had the bullet removed, the surgery necessitating some seventeen stiches."

In a ceremony attended by several members of the government, he was awarded the Scott Medal at Templemore on 2 October 1975.

== See also ==
- Yvonne Burke (Garda)
- Brian Connaughton
- Michael J. Reynolds
- Joseph Scott
- Deaths of Henry Byrne and John Morley (1980)
- Death of Jerry McCabe (1996)
