= John Aiden Donnelly =

Recipient of the Scott Medal

John Aiden Donnelly (born 1952), Garda Síochána 20051D and recipient of the Scott Medal.

== Background ==
Donnelly is a native of Ballinasloe, County Galway. He had worked as a bus conductor prior to joining the force in 1975.

== Incident at supermarket ==
"Garda Donnelly was off duty and accompanied by his two-year-old daughter on the evening of 26 January 1989. he arrived at the supermarket in his own car just as three armed raiders were leaving the store. Garda Donnelly moved his car so as to block the raiders' getaway vehicle. The gunmen then fired a shot at his car window and tried to hijack the car. Garda Donnelly steadfastly refused to given them his car keys, forcing the raiders to flee from the scene on foot. One of them was eventually arrested and received a prison sentence for the robbery."

Garda Donnelly received his Scott Bronze medal at Templemore on 23 November 1990 and was promoted to Sergeant one month later.

== See also ==
- Yvonne Burke (Garda)
- Brian Connaughton
- Joseph Scott
- Deaths of Henry Byrne and John Morley (1980)
- Death of Jerry McCabe (1996)
