= Martin Walsh (police officer) =

Irish police officer

Martin K. Walsh (born 25 May 1945) was an Irish policeman with Garda Síochána (Sergeant 16180) and a recipient of the Scott Medal.

== Background ==
Walsh was a native of Gurteen, Ballinasloe, County Galway, and joined the force on 21 April 1965.

== Incident at Cabinteely ==
Walsh was on patrol on 11 July 1967, in Cabinteely, Dublin. At 2.45 a.m., he went to investigate a car parked at a filling station, but it made off at high speed. A high-speed chase, over a distance of some two and a half miles, ensued, ending when the car crashed into a wall. A man fled the scene, and on being tackled by Walsh began to assault the garda, who found that the man was much larger. The man used a foot-long metal tool to hit Walsh on his left, causing him to retreat. Returning, Walsh removed the tool only to find that the assailant had a screwdriver; however, he was able to disable him long enough to detain him at a doorway and ring a doorbell, looking for assistance.

But the assailant then made a frantic effort to free himself. In the course of this he managed to pin the increasingly faint and exhausted Garda to the ground and proceeded to stab him round the eyes with the screwdriver, seemingly intent on killing him. With a herculean effort Guard Walsh threw the man off and, as he attempted again to flee, brought him to the ground and disarmed him. He then grasped the man's hair and struck his head several times against the footpath, weakening him and finally gaining the upper hand. A patrol car arrived at this point and took the young Guard, who was unable to rise and almost blind, to a hospital.

Promoted to sergeant while in hospital, Walsh received the Scott Silver Medal on 2 May 1968, retiring on 23 May 2002. His assailant was sentenced to three years of penal servitude.

== See also ==
- Yvonne Burke (Garda)
- Brian Connaughton
- Joseph Scott
- Deaths of Henry Byrne and John Morley (1980)
- Death of Jerry McCabe (1996)
- Brian Walsh (politician)
- Joseph Walsh (archbishop of Tuam)
- Kevin Walsh (Gaelic footballer)
