= Michael Henegan =

Irish police officer

Michael Henegan (15 September 1929 – 9 October 2002) was a member of the Garda Síochána 10307A and recipient of the Scott Medal.

== Background ==
Heneghan was a native of Milltown, County Galway, and had worked as an insurance agent prior to joining the force in 1952.

== Incident at Drimnagh ==
Henegan, along with Garda Kevin Patrick Duffin and John O'Loughlin, was awarded the Scott Medal for valor in an incident on 3 October 1968.

A patrol car, driven by O'Loughlin with three other Gardaí, engaged in a high-speed pursuit of a stolen car between Ballyfermot and Drimnagh in Dublin. The stolen vehicle likewise contained four men, one of whom fired twice with a rifle at the patrol car. The chase continued until the stolen vehicle crashed in a cul-de-sac, but the thieves fled into back gardens.

At this stage, all patrol cars in the area were responding. Garda's Duffin and Henegan encountered three men, including the man with the rifle, who took aim at them. Duffin subdued the armed man while Henegan overpowered a second (the third man fled the scene). It was later found that the rifle aimed at Duffin and Henegan was fully operational, with one round in the breech and three more in the magazine.

All three were awarded the Scott Medals on 2 October 1975. Michael Henegan retired on 15 August 1986, and died on 9 October 2002.

== See also ==
- Yvonne Burke (Garda)
- Brian Connaughton
- Joseph Scott
- Deaths of Henry Byrne and John Morley (1980)
- Death of Jerry McCabe (1996)
