= Patrick Farrell (police officer) =

Irish police officer (1909–??)

Patrick Farrell, Garda Síochána #8232 (born 6 June 1909, date of death unknown) was a recipient of the Scott Medal.

== Background ==
Farrell was born at Doon, Loughrea, County Galway. He had been a farmer prior to joining the Gardaí on 8 March 1932.

== Incident at Kilsheelan ==
Farrell was awarded the Scott Bronze Medal by Minister for Justice Brian Lenihan in November 1966. It was in recognition of his valour during a violent incident lasting over an hour, at Kilsheelan, County Tipperary, on 12 June 1965, when he subdued a mentally-ill man brandishing a shotgun.

Farrell retired on 5 June 1972.

== See also ==
- Yvonne Burke (Garda)
- Brian Connaughton
- Joseph Scott
- Deaths of Henry Byrne and John Morley (1980)
- Death of Jerry McCabe (1996)

== Sources ==
- An Garda Síochána and the Scott Medal, Gerard O'Brien, Four Courts Press, 2008. ISBN 978-1-84682-124-0
