= Henry L. Smith =

Recipient of the Scott Medal

Henry L. Smith (24 January 1898 – after 9 January 1954) was a Garda Síochána and recipient of the Scott Medal.

== Background ==
Smith was born in Salthill, County Galway, and worked as a farmer prior to joining the force as Garda 1969 on 18 October 1922.

== Incident at Killaloe ==
Smith was awarded the Scott Silver Medal for actions while stationed at Killaloe, County Clare, on 13 August 1932. The area was subject to an unusually severe cloud burst that led to flooding at a house about a mile from the Garda Station.

Arriving at the scene with his colleagues Sergeant Staunton and Garda Connolly, they persuaded a lorry driver to take them to the house, which, located in a hollow, was fast becoming a torrential lake.

The three Gardaí found the owner, Mrs. Woodroofe, clinging to the upper edge of her front door to avoid being swept away. Her bedridden husband and infant child were still within. Garda Smith

"plunged through the torrent, risking the treacherous pot-holes which surrounded the building, seized Mrs Woodroofe and passed her to his colleagues who had followed him. Smith then returned again to the house through the still-rising water. This time he managed to secure Mrs Woodroofe's baby; tragically child had drowned. for the third time, accompanied on this occasion by Garda Connolly, Smith re-entered the house and found Mr. Woodroofe in a room off the kitchen. Despite their imminent danger of being cut off by the water ... both men got Mr Woodruffe onto a materess which they then used as a raft to float him ... to safety."

== Later life ==
Smith spent much of his later life and career in the Tipperary Division, retiring on 9 January 1954 after serving thirty-one years and sixty-one days. His subsequent life is unknown.

== See also ==
- Yvonne Burke (Garda)
- Brian Connaughton
- Joseph Scott
- Deaths of Henry Byrne and John Morley (1980)
- Death of Jerry McCabe (1996)
- Death of Adrian Donohoe (2013)
