= Patrick J. Molloy =

Irish police officer

- Born: 11 March 1961 (age 65); Renmore, Galway, Ireland
- Known for: Recipient of the Scott Medal
- Police career
- Allegiance: Ireland
- Service years: Joined 1982
- Rank: Garda
- Badge no.: 22601G
- Awards: Scott Medal (1998)

Patrick J. Molloy (born 11 March 1961) is an Irish law enforcement officer with Garda Síochána (22601G) and a recipient of the Scott Medal.

== Background ==
Molloy is a native of Renmore, Galway, and joined the force in 1982

== Incident in Limerick ==
Gardai Molloy, Augustine Fox and Patrick D. O'Callaghan were patrolling Sarsfield Barracks housing estate in Limerick in the early hours of 14 July 1996 when they came across a house fire. Molloy and O'Callaghan forced their way inside but "were met with a blast of intense heat and a pall of oily smoke. Garda O'Callaghan, crawling about on all fours, found two terrified children standing in a corner. He and Garda Molloy grabbed a child each and managed to get them past the blazing hallyway and out the front door to safety."

Upon learning that there was still another child in the house, all three Gardaí attempted to reach the upstairs bedroom where the child was located but were driven back. A further attempt was made by Fox, but he was unsuccessful. However the fire brigade arrived at this time and rescued the child.

All three Gardaí needed hospitalisation for smoke and cuts. They were awarded the Scott Medal on 23 July 1998.

== See also ==
- Yvonne Burke (Garda)
- Brian Connaughton
- Joseph Scott
- Deaths of Henry Byrne and John Morley (1980)
- Death of Jerry McCabe (1996)
