= Michael Noel Canavan =

Irish police officer (born 1958)

Michael Noel Canavan (born 1958) was an Irish policeman with Garda Síochána (21578C) and a recipient of the Scott Medal.

== Background ==
Canavan was a native of Tuam, County Galway, and joined the Irish police force in 1978. He was awarded the Scott Medal in recognition of his valour in the arrest of Sean "Bap" Hughes of the Irish National Liberation Army (INLA), on 16 May 1997.

== Incident at Foxford ==
Canavan was off duty when he observed a man acting suspiciously enter the Bank of Ireland, following which there was a shotgun blast, after which bank customers fled the building. Pausing only to open a pub door asking the owner to call the garda, Canavan turned back to find the robber running towards a parked car, where he caught him.

The robber threatened the life of Canavan, reached into his pocket but was grabbed at the wrist. During the violent struggle the robber entered the car, and grabbing a shotgun on the back seat, aimed it at Canavan, who pushed the barrel upwards and eventually subdued the suspect.

It was later determined that the robber did indeed have a pistol in his pocket and a live round in the shotgun.

The robber was identified as Sean "Bap" Hughes of the INLA, who was wanted in connection with the disappearance of Seamus Ruddy near Paris in 1985, and the murder of Garda Patrick Gerard Reynolds in Dublin in 1982. Hughes was acquitted on the charge of murder but imprisoned on the charge of robbery.

Minister of Justice, John O'Donoghue, awarded Canavan the Scott Medal at Templemore on 23 July 2003.

== See also ==
- Garda ar Lár
- Yvonne Burke (Garda)
- Brian Connaughton
- Michael J. Reynolds
- Deaths of Henry Byrne and John Morley (1980)
- Death of Jerry McCabe (1996)
- Death of Adrian Donohoe (2013)
