= Tormey =

Tormey may refer to:

== Places ==
- Tormey, California

== Surname ==
- James Tormey (born 1839), Irish-born American politician
- John Tormey (1937–2022), American actor and producer
- Roland Tormey (born 1971), Irish sociologist, teacher, researcher and curriculum developer
- Stan Tormey (1916–1971), Australian rules footballer
- Thomas Joseph Tormey (born 1943), Irish police officer
- Tony Tormey, Irish actor
