= Capital punishment in Ireland =

Europe holds the greatest concentration of abolitionist states (blue). Map current as of 2022 Abolished for all offences Abolished in practice Retains capital punishment

Capital punishment in Ireland was abolished in statute law in 1990, having been abolished in 1964 for most offences including ordinary murder. The last person to be executed by the State in Ireland was Michael Manning, hanged for murder in 1954. All subsequent death sentences in Ireland, the last handed down in 1985, were commuted by the President of Ireland, on the advice of the Government, to terms of imprisonment of up to 1,000,000 years. The Twenty-first Amendment to the constitution of the Republic, passed by referendum in 2001, prohibits the reintroduction of the death penalty, even during a state of emergency or war. Capital punishment is also forbidden by several human rights treaties to which the state is a party.

== Early history ==
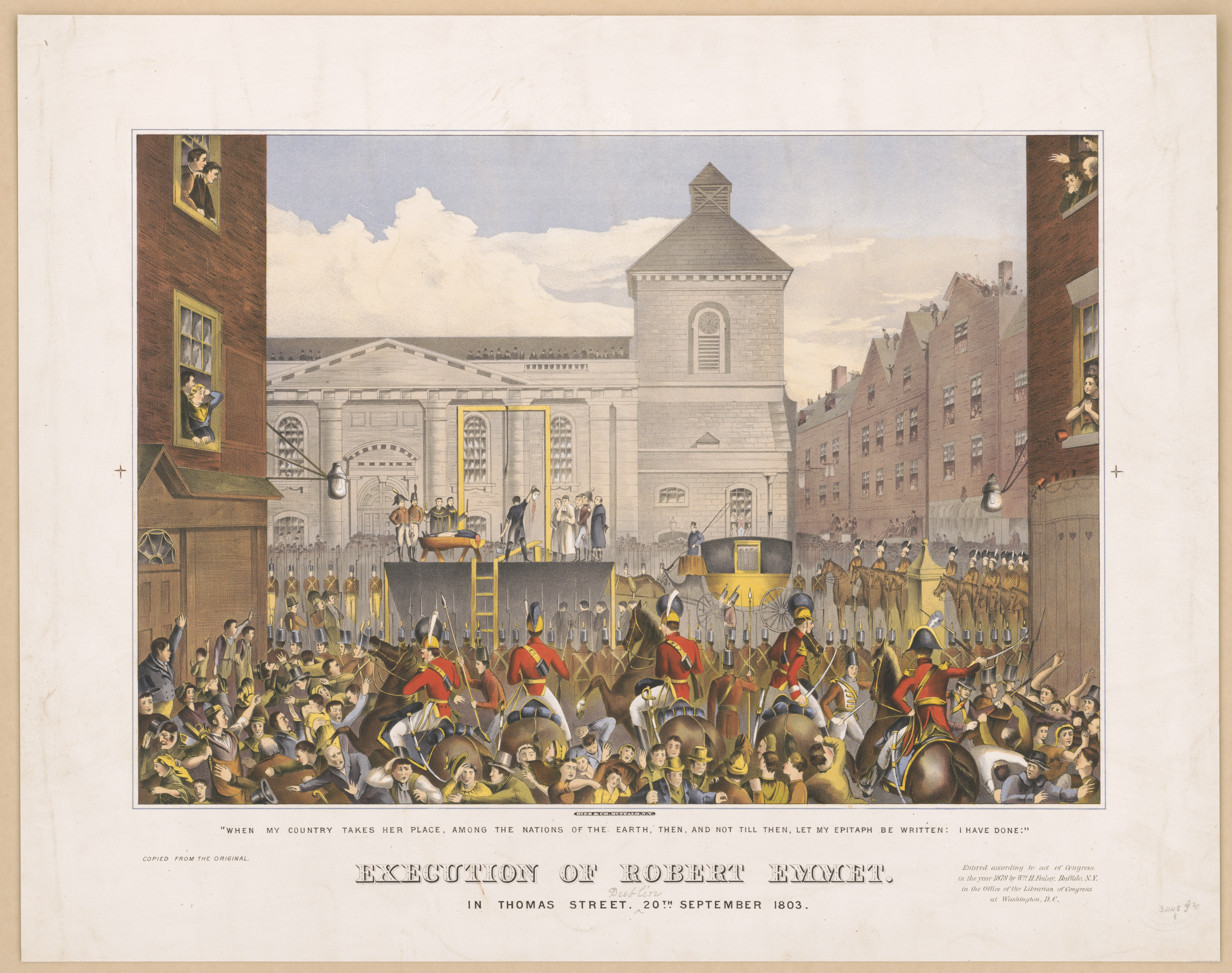
Execution of Robert Emmet on Thomas Street, Dublin, 1803

Early Irish law discouraged capital punishment. Murder was usually punished with two types of fine: a fixed éraic and a variable Log nEnech; a murderer was only killed if he and his relatives could not pay the fine. The Senchas Már's description of the execution of the murderer of Saint Patrick's charioteer Odran has been interpreted as a failed attempt to replace restorative justice with retributive justice.

After the Norman conquest of Ireland, English law provided the model for Irish law. This originally mandated a death sentence for any felony, a class of crimes established by common law but, in Ireland as in England, was extended by various Acts of Parliament; a situation later dubbed the "Bloody Code". After the Irish Reformation, the Protestant Ascendancy to impede Roman Catholic practices passed Penal Laws, some of which created capital crimes which produced Irish Catholic Martyrs. The gallows speech was a popular genre of broadside from the Williamite revolution through the eighteenth century, feeding into popular ballads of the nineteenth century. In 1789 Elizabeth Sugrue ("Lady Betty") was among 26 led to the County Roscommon gallows; when the hangman failed to appear, she agreed to hang the other 25 if the sheriff would stay her own execution. She remained county executioner until 1802, when her death sentence was commuted to life imprisonment.

Most Penal Laws were repealed or disused by the late 18th century. As late as 1834 the officiant at an unlicensed Catholic–Protestant marriage had a sentence of death recorded, albeit commuted to 18 months' imprisonment. The Criminal Law Act 1827 allowed judges to sentence to transportation for many hitherto capital crimes. For more, Peel's Acts in 1828 replaced the death penalty with penal servitude. The Capital Punishment (Ireland) Act 1842 brought the law in Ireland closer to that of England by reducing the penalties for numerous offences, and abolishing the capital crime of serving in the army or navy of France. The Offences Against the Person Act 1861 reduced the number of capital crimes from over two hundred to just three: murder, treason and piracy with violence. Death was a mandatory sentence for murder, though it was often commuted. The last public hanging in Ireland was of John Logue in Downpatrick in 1866; after the Capital Punishment Amendment Act 1868 executions were carried out behind prison walls. Irish doctor Samuel Haughton developed the humane "Standard Drop" method of hanging that came into use in 1866.

The Children Act 1908 (8 Edw. 7. c. 67) abolished the death penalty for a child or "young person" aged under 16.

Execution of Irish republicans created political martyrs, such as the "Manchester Martyrs" of 1867. The Prevention of Crime (Ireland) Act, 1882, was enacted during the Land War and introduced on the day of the funeral of Lord Frederick Cavendish, one of the Phoenix Park murder victims. This empowered non-jury trials to impose death sentences, prompting Francis Alexander FitzGerald to resign in protest as baron of the exchequer. In fact no death sentence was passed under the provisions of that Act.

== Revolutionary period ==
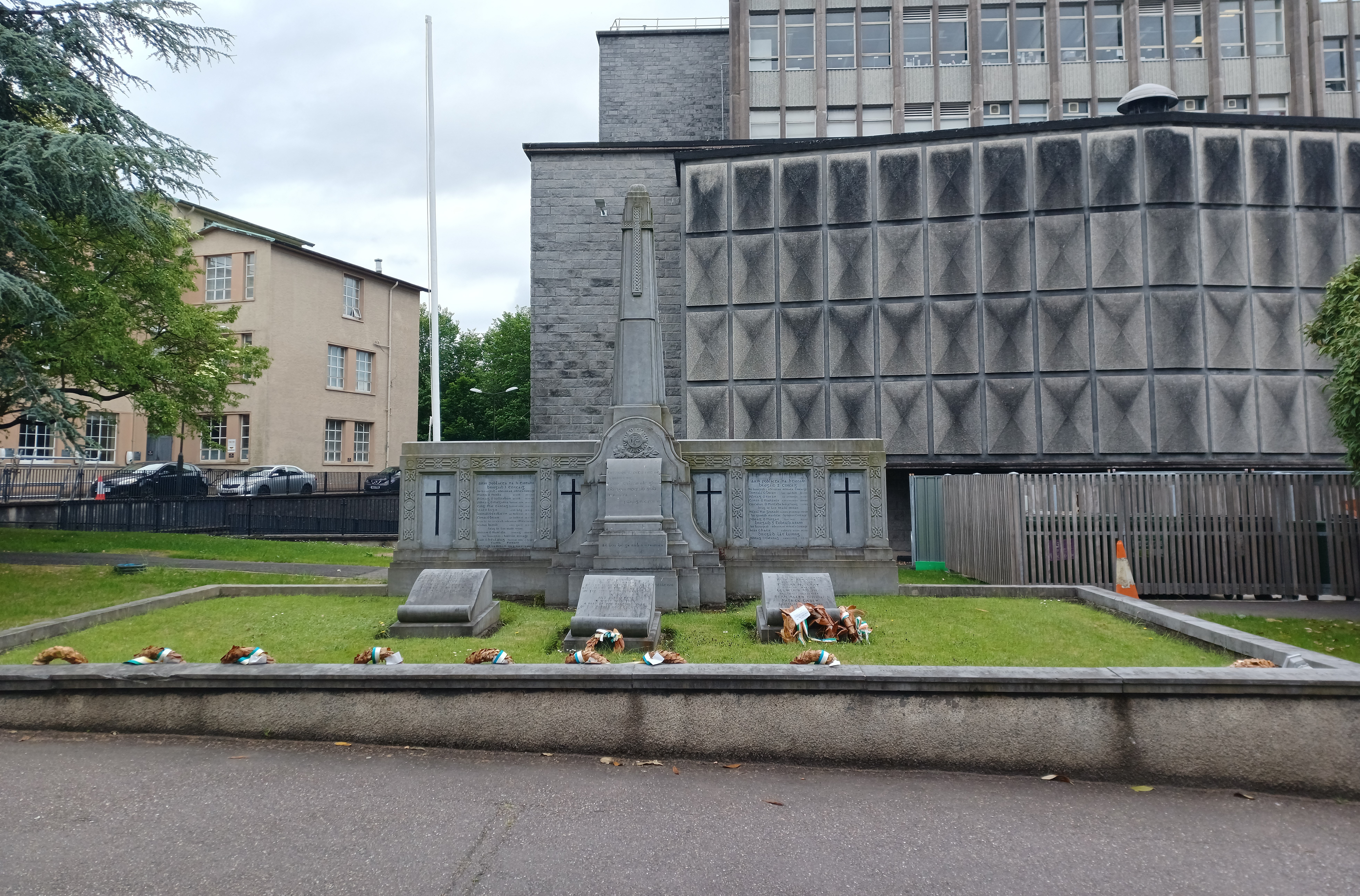
Burial plot and memorial to 13 IRA prisoners executed 1920–1921 and buried in the former Cork County Gaol

In 1916, the execution of the leaders of the Easter Rising turned public sympathy in favour of the rebels. 24 rebels were executed during the 1919–21 War of Independence, starting with Kevin Barry. In Munster, which was under martial law, 13 were shot in Cork and one in Limerick. "The Forgotten Ten" were hanged in Mountjoy Prison, which helped turn opinion in Dublin against the Dublin Castle administration. The last execution under British authority was of William Mitchell, a Black and Tan convicted of the murder of a justice of the peace.

The forces of the Irish Republic proclaimed in 1916, which fought the 1919–21 War against the British authorities, established its own republican courts. In summer 1920, when a County Meath republican court sentenced a man to death for murder, the sentence was referred to the Dáil ministry, which decided to uphold it, although Constance Markievicz was reluctant. The Irish Republican Army was empowered by the First Dáil to court-martial and execute pro-unionist civilians for such crimes as "spying" and collaboration. The procedures at such trials depended on the local IRA leadership; many were kangaroo courts imposing summary justice. Besides executions, IRA members also carried out combat operations, assassinations, extrajudicial killings, and personally motivated murders, with varying levels of sanction from the republican leadership; historians have commented that the dividing lines between these categories can be blurred and contentious; an example being the 1922 Dunmanway killings.

The 1922 committee drafting the Constitution of the Irish Free State submitted three drafts, of which Draft B explicitly prohibited the death penalty; the Provisional Government's final draft was based on Draft B but deleted this prohibition. British laws prescribing the death penalty thus continued in force. The death penalty was retained because of the outbreak of the 1922–3 Civil War. As well as the existing British laws, the Army (Emergency Powers) Resolution was passed by the provisional parliament on 28 September 1922 endorsing the National Army (pro-treaty IRA) decision to codify emergency provisions including the establishment of military courts and tribunals with the power to impose death sentences. The National Army made such regulations on 2 October 1922, revised 8–17 January 1923. In the course of the Civil War there were 81 executions by firing squad under these military tribunals. All summary executions 'official' (81) and 'unofficial' (130–50) were extrajudicial having no legal basis. All summary and arbitrary executions were carried out under martial-law introduced by the pro-treaty IRA on 11 July 1922. Unofficial executions were carried out with varying levels of government complicity. In the first decades of the new state's existence, many petitions asking cabinet ministers to commute death sentences adverted to the fact that many ministers had themselves been under sentence of death by either the British or the Irish Free State during the revolutionary period.

== Later executions ==
Between November 1923 and April 1954, there were a total of 35 executions in Ireland. 55 men and women were also sentenced to death in that time period but ultimately received a reprieve. Thirteen were sentenced for murdering their newborns, and 42 for other types of murder. In the 1920s, execution was relatively common for murderers. The only woman executed after independence was Annie Walsh in 1925. She and her nephew blamed each other for the murder of her elderly husband. The press expected only the nephew to be found guilty, but both were. She was hanged aged 31 in spite of the jury recommending clemency.

In the absence of a local executioner, the Irish government retained the pre-independence custom of having a British hangman come to Mountjoy Prison to perform executions. A resident Irishman, alias "Thomas Johnston", (Note: A 2016 RTÉ Radio 1 documentary identified him as James O'Sullivan (1897/8–1978) from Cork, and wondered whether his alias related to an alleged Irish-born hangman in South Africa named Thomas Johnston.) applied to Mountjoy in 1941, and in 1945, after two days' training from Albert Pierrepoint at Strangeways, assisted Pierrepoint hanging James Lehman. Hired as sole hangman for Joseph McManus in 1947, Johnston nervously ceded to Pierrepoint and never served again.

Increased IRA activity during the state of emergency in World War II led to six executions. Five were shot by firing squad after sentence by military tribunals under the Emergency Powers Act 1939. Of these, Maurice O'Neill (Irish republican) and Richard Goss had shot but not killed Gardaí: the only people executed by the state for a non-murder crime. (Two armed bank robbers were shot at Tuam at the end of May 1922 by the pro-treaty army) Charlie Kerins, the IRA Chief of Staff, executed for murdering a Garda, was hanged rather than shot, making the point of treating him as a common criminal rather than a political prisoner. Pierrepoint's autobiography claimed the IRA had ambitions to kidnap him while he was en route to Kerins.

Harry Gleeson, hanged in 1941 for the 1940 murder of Moll McCarthy, was granted a posthumous pardon in 2015. Seán MacBride was Gleeson's defence counsel and attributed his later opposition to the death penalty to his belief in Gleeson's innocence. Michael Manning was the last person executed in the Republic, while Robert McGladdery was the last person executed on the island of Ireland. Manning was hanged for murder by Albert Pierrepoint on 20 April 1954. The same year, Brendan Behan's play The Quare Fellow premiered, in which the title character was modelled on Bernard Kirwan, awaiting execution in Mountjoy while Behan was imprisoned there.

== Legal developments ==
The 1922 "Special Powers Act" was replaced after the Civil War by a series of Public Safety Acts promoted by Cumann na nGaedheal governments to counter residual republican paramilitary activity. The 1923 act, valid for six months, allowed the death penalty for "armed revolt against the Government of Saorstát Eireann [the Irish Free State]", whereas the 1924 act, valid for one year, reduced this to life imprisonment. The Treasonable Offences Act, 1925 defined such offences as treason punishable by death. The Court Officers Act 1926 phased out the office of under-sheriff and transferred responsibility for executions to the governor of the relevant prison; always Mountjoy Prison in practice. The Public Safety Act 1927, passed in response to the assassination of Kevin O'Higgins, provided for a special military tribunal during a state of emergency, required the tribunal to pass death sentences for treason and murder, and permitted it to do so for unlawful possession of firearms; no appeal would be permitted. The Act was originally to last five years, but was expired at the end of 1928. In 1931, Eoin O'Duffy used the threat posed by Saor Éire to press for a new Public Safety Act, the Constitution (Amendment No. 17) Act 1931. This empowered the tribunal to try a variety of crimes and impose a greater sentence than usual, including death, if "in the opinion of the Tribunal such greater punishment is necessary or expedient". This provision was condemned by the Fianna Fáil opposition (which came to power following the 1932 general election) and was never invoked. The tribunal's sole death sentence was for murder, handed down in 1936 and commuted to life imprisonment.

Fianna Fáil introduced a new Constitution in 1937, which contained several references to execution:

Article 13 section 6
The right of pardon and the power to commute or remit punishment imposed by any court exercising criminal jurisdiction are hereby vested in the President, but such power of commutation or remission may, except in capital cases, also be conferred by law on other authorities.
Article 40 section 4

Subsection 5
Where an order is made under this section by the High Court or a judge thereof for the production of the body of a person who is under sentence of death, the High Court or such judge thereof shall further order that the execution of the said sentence of death shall be deferred until after the body of such person has been produced before the High Court and the lawfulness of his detention has been determined and if, after such deferment, the detention of such person is determined to be lawful, the High Court shall appoint a day for the execution of the said sentence of death and that sentence shall have effect with the substitution of the day so appointed for the day originally fixed for the execution thereof.
Subsection 6
Nothing in this section, however, shall be invoked to prohibit, control, or interfere with any act of the Defence Forces during the existence of a state of war or armed rebellion.

Article 39 of the Constitution narrowed the definition of treason, and the Treason Act 1939 retained the death penalty for the redefined offence.

The military court operating during the Emergency of the Second World War was required to impose a sentence of "death by shooting", from which there was no appeal, although commutation was possible. The crimes in its remit were: committing, "attempting or conspiring to commit, or aiding, abetting counselling or procuring the commission" of the following:— treason; murder; wounding while resisting arrest; unlawful imprisonment; causing an explosion; unlawful possession of explosives, firearms, or ammunition; damaging equipment of the Defence Forces or "essential services"; and "obtaining, recording, or communicating in any manner likely to prejudice the public safety or the preservation of the State of any information directly or indirectly prejudicial to the State".

The Children Act 1941 raised the minimum age for execution from 16 to 17. A committee appointed "to Consider and Report on the Law and Practice relating to Capital Punishment" reported in 1941. It comprised four judges with experience of murder trials, chaired by the Chief Justice, Timothy Sullivan. The committee was precluded from considering abolition of the death penalty. It said the law was generally unproblematic, but recommended changes to the insanity defence and also making infanticide a separate crime from murder. The latter was effected by the Infanticide Act 1949. Since independence, all 13 death sentences for murder in such cases had been commuted. Seán Mac Eoin, the Minister for Justice, said the new act was intended "to eliminate all the terrible ritual of the black cap and the solemn words of the judge pronouncing sentence of death in those cases ... where it is clear to the Court and to everybody, except perhaps the unfortunate accused, that the sentence will never be carried out." Even before 1949, most infanticides were convicted of manslaughter or concealment of birth rather than murder; conversely, a murder charge was still possible after 1949 (as in the 1984 Kerry Babies case).

The Criminal Justice Act 1951, in conformance with Article 13.6 of the Constitution, explicitly excluded capital cases from those to which the Government was granted the power to commute sentences. The Geneva Conventions Act 1962 permitted, but did not require, death sentences for "Grave breaches" of the 1949 Geneva Conventions involving "wilful killing".

Successive Ministers for Justice were asked in the Dáil about abolishing the death penalty: in 1936 by Frank MacDermot; in 1939 by Jeremiah Hurley; in 1948 by James Larkin Jnr and Peadar Cowan; in 1956 by Thomas Finlay; in 1960 by Frank Sherwin; in 1962 by Stephen Coughlan. In each case the relevant minister dismissed the suggestion. Seán MacBride expressed personal support for abolition even while a minister in a government that oversaw the 1948 execution of William M. Gambon. In 1951–52, MacBride's Dáil motion that a Select Committee consider whether to abolish the death penalty was defeated by 63 votes to 23. In 1956, the Seanad passed a motion "That in the opinion of Seanad Eireann the Government should consider the question of introducing legislation to abolish capital punishment or to suspend it for an experimental period".

=== Criminal Justice Act 1964 ===
When Seán Brady asked in February 1963, minister Charles Haughey (who had dismissed the suggestion in the previous year) announced "that the death penalty for murder generally will be abolished but it will be retained for certain specific types of murder." The same principle of limited retention was in the UK's Homicide Act 1957. In 1984 Haughey said, "Very shortly after becoming minister for justice, I went up to Mountjoy to see the condemned cell and I was so revolted by the whole atmosphere that I resolved to do away with the death penalty." The Criminal Justice Act 1964 abolished the death penalty for piracy with violence, some military crimes, Geneva Conventions breaches, and most murders. It continued to be available for:

- treason
- offences under military law, relating to
  - neglect of command
  - assisting the enemy
  - passivity as a prisoner of war
  - mutiny
- "capital murder", i.e.
  - of a Garda or prison officer "acting in the course of his duty"; or
  - for a political motive, of a foreign head of state, diplomat, or government member; or
  - in the course or furtherance of certain offences under the Offences against the State Act 1939:
    - Usurpation of functions of government (Irish republican legitimists believed the IRA Army Council was the legitimate government of Ireland)
    - Obstruction of government (legislative, judicial, or executive branches)
    - Obstruction of the President
    - Interference with military or other employees of the State
    - Furtherance of the aims of an organisation which is unlawful for reasons other than tax resistance (this applied to the Irish Republican Army and Irish National Liberation Army)

The list of actions constituting "capital murder" was somewhat different from those in the 1957 UK act.

The Extradition Act, 1965 prevented extradition where the prisoner could be sentenced to death for a crime not punishable by death in Ireland.

The meaning of "capital murder" under the 1964 act was elucidated by the Supreme Court in the 1977 case of Noel and Marie Murray, convicted of capital murder after the 1975 shooting of a Garda, who was off duty and not in uniform, giving chase after they had robbed a bank. The court held that "capital murder" was a new offence, not merely a subtype of the existing common-law offence of murder; and that the Garda was acting "in the course of his duty", despite not being on duty; but that, as he was in plain clothes, the Murrays did not know he was a Garda; and so, while there was intent (mens rea) to commit murder, there was no intent to commit capital murder.

== Commuted death sentences ==
From 1923 to 1964, 40 death sentences were commuted to life imprisonment; three condemned were found insane, and three died awaiting execution. Criminology professor Ian O'Donnell wrote in 2016 that murderers with commuted death sentences "were released after periods of time that would be considered absurdly short today". In the years 1946–62, 82 murders produced 73 arrests; of these 34 were unfit to plead because of insanity, 7 found guilty but insane, and 18 found guilty and thus mandatorily sentenced to death. The sentences were executed on 3 and commuted on the other 15, including all three women. Mamie Cadden was sentenced to be hanged in 1957 for felony murder after performing an illegal abortion on a woman who died.

Death sentences were passed on 11 people after the 1964 Act, for 5 different incidents involving the capital murder of a total of 6 Gardaí (police). All were imposed by the Special Criminal Court. The murders of several other gardaí, and of British ambassador Christopher Ewart-Biggs in 1976, might also have constituted capital crimes had any prosecution been brought. Before kidnapped businessman Tiede Herrema's 1975 rescue, The Irish Times reported government suggestions that his threatened killing by the IRA would be "furthering the activities of an unlawful organisation" and hence capital murder.

Of the 11 sentenced to death, 2 had the conviction for capital murder quashed on appeal, and were convicted instead of ordinary murder. The death sentences of the other 9 were commuted by the President on the advice of the government, to 40 years' imprisonment without parole. One conviction was overturned in 1995. The 40-year sentences were controversial, both because they had no statutory basis, and because they were not handed down by a judge. The Court of Criminal Appeal has upheld the sentences as the extrajudicial procedure is in step with the Irish Constitution's provision for commuting sentences.

Four convicts were released in 1998 under the amnesty of political prisoners under the Good Friday Agreement. The remaining four protested that they were also eligible for the amnesty, but were not released under its provisions. The state refused to grant the standard remission of sentences due for good behaviour, which would make them eligible for parole after 30 years. One of the four, Noel Callan, took a court case that he was entitled to remission, which was rejected by the High Court in 2011, but upheld by the Supreme Court in 2013. Two of the four, who had already served over thirty years, were released straight away, while Callan and the fourth were released in December 2015 upon reaching 30 years.

Date of crime	Convicted	Victims	Context	Location	Date sentence passed	Date scheduled for execution	Date sentence commuted	Notes
1975-09-11	Marie and Noel Murray	Garda Michael J. Reynolds	Shot after a robbery of the Bank of Ireland in Killester	Saint Anne's Park, Dublin	1976-06-09		1976-12-09	Black Cross anarchists. The capital murder conviction was quashed as the Garda was off duty and not in uniform; instead, a life sentence was imposed for ordinary murder. Released after serving 15 years.
1980-07-07	Paddy McCann, Colm O'Shea (, Peter Pringle)	Garda Henry Byrne, Detective Garda John Morley	Shot after a robbery of the Bank of Ireland in Ballaghaderreen	Near Ballaghaderreen, County Roscommon	1980-11-27	1980-12-19	1981-05-27	Pringle's conviction was overturned in 1995. McCann claimed in a 2009 interview that he was a member of Saor Éire eligible for the Good Friday amnesty. O'Shea was denied release in 2012. Both were released in 2013 after Noel Callan's court case.
1980-10-13	Peter Rogers	Garda Seamus Quaid	Shot while inspecting a van containing explosives, after a robbery in Callan	Ballyconnick, near Cleariestown, County Wexford	1981-03-11		1981-07-01	Provisional IRA member. Released in 1998 under the Good Friday Agreement.
1984-08-10	Thomas Eccles, Patrick McPhillips and Brian McShane	Garda Frank Hand	Shot at a post office raid	Drumree, Co Meath	1985-03-28		1986-02-22	Provisional IRA members. Released in 1998 under the Good Friday Agreement.
1985-06-27	Noel Callan and Michael McHugh	Sergeant Patrick Morrissey	Robbery of Ardee labour exchange	Rathbrist, Knockbridge, County Louth	1985-12-03 (original) 1986-05-14 (Callan appeal)	1986-05-30 (Callan)	1985-12-20 (McHugh) 1986-05-29 (Callan)	INLA members. Callan's sentence was not commuted until after the failure of an appeal against his conviction. Both released in December 2015.

== Abolition ==
Paschal Robinson, the papal nuncio to Ireland from 1930 to 1948, reportedly favoured a trial suspension of capital punishment. In 1937 Rosamond Jacob and John Henry Webb established the Society for the Abolition of the Death Penalty, which unsuccessfully lobbied that the Treason Act 1939 abolish the death penalty for treason.

Noel Browne introduced a private member's bill to abolish the death penalty in Ireland in March 1981. The Fianna Fáil government voted it down on its first reading. Fine Gael had supported the first reading and would have allowed a free vote at the second reading; the Labour Party supported abolition. The Troubles were then ongoing, and the Minister for Justice, Gerry Collins, in opposing the bill, referred to the four death sentences which were then pending appeal, and said "were we to abolish [the death penalty], and because of the violence of recent years, the pressure for arming the Garda would become extremely strong". David Doyle comments that the implication that capital punishment was a deterrent to physical force Irish republicanism was "particularly peculiar" in light of the 1981 hunger strikes, in which ten republican prisoners chose to die.

After the 1981 general election, the Fine Gael–Labour coalition introduced a bill in the Seanad to abolish the death penalty for treason and capital murder, which passed there but had not reached the Dáil when the government fell in January 1982. Independent Senators introduced an identical bill, which began its second reading in 1985 but lapsed at the 1987 dissolution. The Fine Gael–Labour coalition was also drafting an abolition bill at the time. A 1986 Department of Foreign Affairs briefing made public in 2017 said:

The death penalty in this country is largely a quaint throwback to the days when everyone else had one. As we no longer have a hangman, and almost the only country in the world in a position to train one is South Africa, there is no immediate prospect of execution in this jurisdiction. That being said, the abolition of the death penalty would represent a strong political minus in the eyes of certain right-wing groupings, including the gardaí, the RUC and the DUP. While the step would be practically meaningless, it could be used in a politically damaging way.

Independent Senators reintroduced abolition bills in 1987 and again after the 1989 election. In 1988, the Progressive Democrats (PDs) produced an aspirational "Constitution for a New Republic", which included a prohibition on capital punishment.

Ireland's 1989 ratification of the International Covenant on Civil and Political Rights (ICCPR), effective 8 March 1990, made a reservation to Article 6(5). The Article reads "Sentence of death shall not be imposed for crimes committed by persons below eighteen years of age and shall not be carried out on pregnant women." The Irish government's declaration read "Pending the introduction of further legislation to give full effect to the provisions of paragraph 5 of Article 6, should a case arise which is not covered by the provisions of existing law, the Government of Ireland will have regard to its obligations under the Covenant in the exercise of its power to advise commutation of the sentence of death." The legislation referred to was the Child Care Bill 1988, which became law in 1991; a section was to have been included to raise from 17 to 18 the minimum age for the death penalty. In May 1989, Fianna Fáil minister Michael Woods stated:

I appreciate that there is support for the abolition of the death penalty and, in more normal times, I accept that there would be merit in a full and open debate on the pros and cons of such a move. However, times are not normal and there are armed subversive groups inimical to the institutions of the State. In such circumstances, my primary concern – and that of the Minister for Justice – is to provide the maximum protection possible for those who defend our democratic institutions. I am concerned that a move to abolish the death penalty at present could give the wrong signal. It would remove the additional protection which the death penalty provides for members of the Garda Síochána and the Prison Service, who are especially at risk from violent criminals, some of whom have been murdered in the execution of their duty.

After the 1989 general election, Fianna Fáil formed a coalition with the PDs; the agreed programme for government included abolishing the death penalty in Ireland. Despite opposition from Garda representative organisations, the death penalty was abolished for all offences by the Criminal Justice Act 1990, which made life imprisonment the penalty for what had been capital crimes, and all except the military crimes had a minimum term of not less than forty years; remission rules are stricter than for other crimes. The Child Care Bill 1988 was still pending, so the section relating to the death penalty was removed as superfluous. Although media sometimes still use the term "capital murder", the legal term is now "murder to which section 3 of the Criminal Justice Act 1990 applies". (Note: The unamended headings of two amended sections of the Defence Act 1954 still refer to "capital offences".) In 1993, the Tánaiste, Dick Spring, said in Vienna that the 1990 abolition should be made irreversible, which Taoiseach Albert Reynolds later confirmed was government policy and would involve a constitutional amendment. However, the government fell six months later.

One recommendation of the 1996 Constitutional Review Group was:

Prohibit the re-introduction of the death penalty. If this is not deemed desirable, Article 40.4.5° should be retained. If it is prohibited, Article 28.3.3° will require amendment so that the death penalty cannot be imposed in any circumstances.

Article 40.4.5° prescribed the treatment of those under sentence of death; Article 28.3.3° deals with the suspension of rights during a state of emergency. On 7 June 2001, the Twenty-first Amendment of the Constitution of Ireland was one of three proposed amendments put to referendums. It added Article 15.5.2°, which prohibits the death penalty; deleted as redundant Article 40.4.5° and several other references to "capital crimes"; and amended Article 28.3.3° to prevent the death penalty being imposed during an emergency. The Referendum Commission produced an information booklet, with arguments for and against the amendment derived from submissions it had solicited from the public. The amendment was passed on a turnout of 34.79%, with 610,455 in favour and 372,950 against. The 38% no-vote was higher than the 28% predicted by polls; there were suggestions that the wording of the ballot question was confusing and that some voters were expressing dissatisfaction with the government.

Ireland adopted the Second Optional Protocol to the ICCPR in 1993, and the Sixth Protocol to the European Convention on Human Rights (ECHR) in 1994, both of which prohibit the death penalty in peacetime. The reservation to ICCPR Article 6(5) was withdrawn in 1994. Ireland ratified the Thirteenth Protocol to the ECHR, which prohibits the death penalty in wartime, at its opening in 2002. As a Member State of the European Union (EU), Ireland is subject to the EU Charter of Fundamental Rights, an extension of the ECHR proclaimed in 2000 which became EU law in 2009.

== Reinterment ==
Those hanged in Mountjoy were buried in unmarked graves in the prison yard. After the 2015 pardon of Harry Gleeson, his next of kin sought his remains for reburial. In 2024 forensic archeologists began excavations in the yard and by July had uncovered 17 sets of remains. Gleeson was reburied in his home place of Holycross on 7 July 2024. The Department of Justice envisages burying the other bodies "respectfully in a suitable cemetery".

== Debate ==
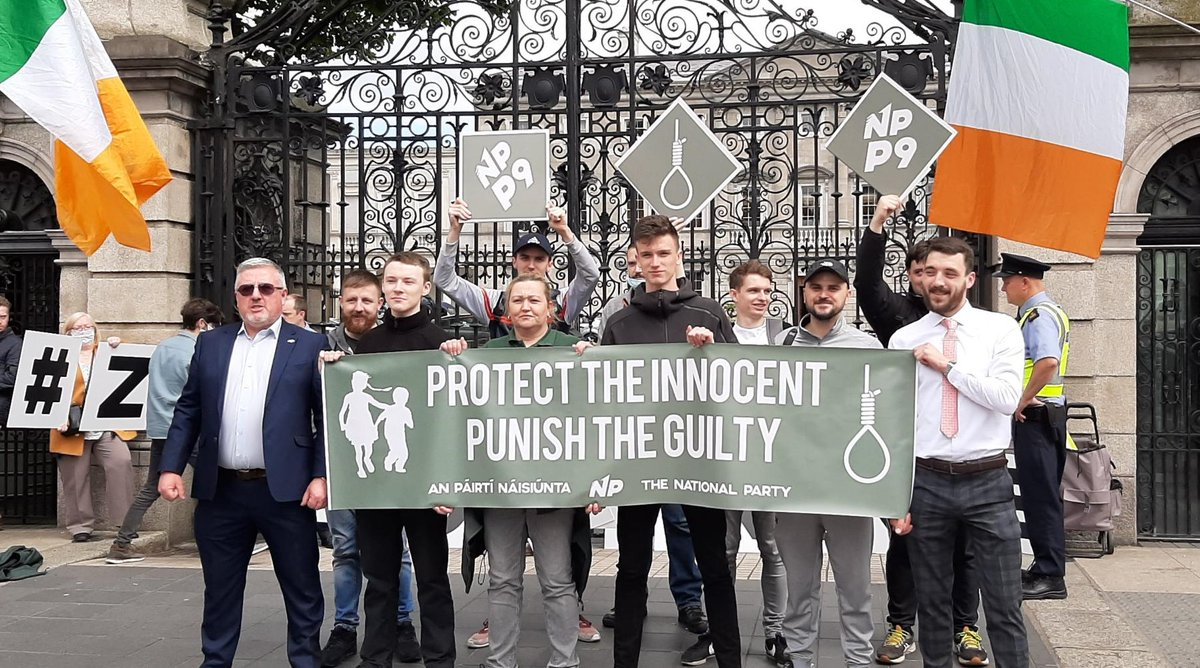
Members of the National Party holding up a banner and signs containing noose imagery during a protest.

As of 17 May 2024, the last scientific opinion poll of Irish support for the death penalty was an international survey in 2000, in which Ireland ranked third lowest of 59 countries at 17%. Doyle and O'Callaghan comment: "This does not imply widespread active popular opposition to the death penalty in Ireland, but there was, at least, a great deal of indifference to it and very little desire to see it ever reintroduced". The media occasionally reports calls to reconsider the ban on capital punishment. In November 2009, Richard Johnson, recently retired as President of the High Court, said that he favoured reintroduction of the death penalty in limited circumstances, such as murder committed during armed robberies. The Irish Council for Civil Liberties described his remarks as "deeply misguided and frivolous". At the January 2010 meeting of the Mid-West Regional Authority, two members of Clare County Council called for "a public debate" on the death penalty. In June 2010, after several gang-related murders in Limerick, outgoing mayor Kevin Kiely advocated the death penalty for "anyone involved in the planning and premeditation of a murder". The National Party, a right-wing group established in 2016, supports reintroduction of the death penalty for "particularly heinous crimes". Kevin Sharkey, seeking to run in the 2018 Irish presidential election, supported the death penalty for home invasions on the elderly.

== See also ==
- Prisoners sentenced to death by Ireland, includes those executed
- Black cap
- Gallows hemp rope
