= Deaths of Garda officers =

Deaths of Garda officers may refer to several killings of officers of Garda, the police force of the Republic of Ireland:

- Deaths of Henry Byrne and John Morley (1980)
- Death of Jerry McCabe (1996)
- Death of Adrian Donohoe (2013)
