= Canavan =

Canavan is a surname of Irish origin. It is Anglicized from Ó Ceanndubháin (now also spelled Ó Ceannubháin), literally "descendant of the dark haired one". The Ó Ceanndubháin sept were hereditary physicians to the O'Flahertys of Connemara. Spelling variations include: Canovan, O'Canavan, Canaman, Kinevan, Kinavan, Kanavan, O'Kennevain, Kinnevan.

== People with the surname ==
- Brian Canavan, current CEO of the Australian National Rugby League team
- Chris Canavan, British actor
- Dennis Canavan, Scottish politician, Member of the Scottish Parliament for Falkirk West
- Ivor Canavan (1929–1999), politician in Northern Ireland
- Jim Canavan, baseball player in the American Association and National League, 1891 to 1897
- John A. Canavan (1896–1963), American attorney in Massachusetts
- Katherine Canavan, United States diplomat and career foreign service officer
- Matt Canavan, Australian Federal MP
- Michael Noel Canavan, Irish police officer, recipient of the Scott Medal
- Myrtelle Canavan, American pathologist who described Canavan disease in 1931
- Niall Canavan, Irish footballer
- Pascal Canavan, Tyrone Gaelic footballer
- Pat Canavan, Dublin Gaelic football player
- Peter Canavan, Tyrone Gaelic footballer
- Peter P. Canavan, Irish police officer, recipient of the Scott Medal
- Trudi Canavan, Australian writer
