= Patrick Molloy =

Patrick Molloy may refer to:

- Patrick Molloy, one of the Bridgewater Four
- Patrick J. Molloy (born 1961), Garda Síochána officer
