= Patrick Farrell =

Patrick Farrell may refer to:

- Patrick Farrell (fencer), Canadian Olympic fencer
- Patrick Farrell (police officer) (1909–?), Garda officer
- Patrick Farrell (footballer) (1872–1950), Irish international footballer
- Patrick Farrell (photojournalist) (born 1959), American photojournalist
- Patrick Farrell (rugby league), Canadian rugby league player for Canada national rugby league team
- Patrick Farrell, mayor of Huntington, West Virginia elected 2025
- Paddy Farrell (born 1913), Irish footballer

== See also ==
- Pat Farrell (disambiguation)
- Patrick O'Farrell (1933–2003), Irish historian
