= Treason in the Republic of Ireland =

Crime of treason in Ireland

The crime of treason is defined by Article 39 of the Constitution of Ireland, adopted in 1937, which states:

Treason shall consist only in levying war against the State, or assisting any State or person or inciting or conspiring with any person to levy war against the State, or attempting by force of arms or other violent means to overthrow the organs of government established by the Constitution, or taking part or being concerned in or inciting or conspiring with any person to make or to take part or be concerned in any such attempt.

== History to 1937 ==
Before the 1921 treaty that led to the creation of the Irish Free State (Saorstát Éireann), treason was governed under the laws of the United Kingdom of Great Britain and Ireland. Many historical Irish nationalist insurgents executed for high treason against the Crown of the United Kingdom or of the earlier Kingdom of Ireland are considered heroes in independent Ireland.

Section 1(1) of the Treasonable Offences Act 1925 (enacted under the 1922 Constitution) defined treason as:

(a) levying war against Saorstát Éireann, or
(b) assisting any state or person engaged in levying war against Saorstát Éireann, or
(c) conspiring with any person (other than his or her wife or husband) or inciting any person to levy war against Saorstát Éireann, or
(d) attempting or taking part or being concerned in an attempt to overthrow by force of arms or other violent means the Government of Saorstát Éireann as established by or under the Constitution, or
(e) conspiring with any person (other than his or her wife or husband) or inciting any person to make or to take part or be concerned in any such attempt.

The maximum punishment was death. The Act also defined the offences of misprision of treason and of encouraging, harbouring, or comforting any person engaged in levying Saorstát Éireann or engaged, taking part, or concerned in any attempt to overthrow by force of arms or other violent means the Government of Saorstát Éireann as established by or under the Constitution of 1922. The Treasonable Offences Act 1925 was the first comprehensive and permanent measure designed to deal with offences against the state, though its measures were largely performative in nature. Section 3 reenacted portions of the Treason Felony Act 1848, while sections 4 and 5 dealt, respectively, with the usurpation of executive authority and assemblies pretending to parliamentary functions. Section 6 prohibited the formation of pretended military or police forces and section 7 proscribed unauthorised drilling.

The Irish Civil War had been fought in 1922–23 between the Free State Army and the "Irregulars" of the Irish Republican Army (IRA) loyal to the Irish Republic proclaimed in 1919. The republicans continued to refuse to recognise the Free State and its successor state. A large minority of the populace had some sympathy with their views, such that the state demurred from prosecuting them for treason. Although the Garda Síochána prosecuted a number of persons under section 1.1(d) in 1925 and 1926, the Minister for Justice, Kevin O'Higgins, believed that such serious charges were not 'desirable in the present conditions'. Rather more bluntly, in March 1930 Eoin O'Duffy, the Garda Commissioner, wrote that the prospect of charging IRA members with 'levying war against the State' or with usurping executive authority would make a 'laughing stock' of the Gardaí. Republicans were prosecuted for lesser offences under the Offences against the State Acts 1939–1998.

== Developments since 1937 ==
The 1937 constitution's definition of treason was influenced by Article Three of the United States Constitution. The pre-independence statutes relating to treason were not explicitly abolished until the Statute Law Revision Act 1983, but were incompatible with the 1937 constitution. The Treason Act 1939 gave legislative effect to Article 39, and provided for the imposition of the death penalty on persons convicted of committing treason within the state and on citizens convicted of committing treason against Ireland outside of the state. The Act also created the ancillary offences of encouraging, harbouring and comforting persons guilty of treason, and the offence of misprision of treason. No person has been charged under this Act. The Criminal Justice Act 1964 abolished capital punishment in the Republic of Ireland generally, but retained it for treason and several other crimes. The Criminal Justice Act 1990 abolished the death penalty completely and set the punishment for treason at life imprisonment, with parole in not less than forty years.

The 1996 report of the Constitution Review Group considered the case for removing or altering the definition of treason in Article 39, and recommended no change. In 2010, in the context of the Irish financial crisis, the Green Party introduced a private member's bill to define the crime of "economic treason" in the Constitution.

== See also ==
- Irish republican legitimatism
- Capital punishment in the Republic of Ireland
- High treason in the United Kingdom
