= List of decrees of the First and Second Dáils =

This is a list of decrees issued by the First and Second Dáils, which were the revolutionary legislatures of the Irish Republic. It is split into two parts: The list of 44 decrees compiled in the early 1920s, and additional items which could also be considered decrees.

== Background ==
The First Dáil was established in early 1919 as a revolutionary body to rival the existing British administration for influence and control of Ireland. It was followed by the Second Dáil, which was in existence from mid-1921 to mid-1922. These Dáils claimed to be the legitimate legislature for the entire island, and as such made legislation in order to govern the country. These pieces of legislation are now referred to as 'decrees', although that term was not uniformly used at the time. (Note: Other terms used include 'bill' and 'motion', or, in some cases, no identifying term at all was used.)

Due to the circumstances in which the Dáil operated, (Note: It had no established civil service or procedural rules to draw on. Additionally, it was banned between September 1919 and July 1921, which forced it to operate underground for a period.) it suffered from poor record keeping, which makes investigation of its activities difficult. There are two sources for the decrees: the archive documents of the Dáil (most decrees are just typescript on unheaded paper) and the printed volumes of Dáil debates. These two sources frequently contradict each other, for example, a decree that exists in the archive not being stated in the debates to have been passed as a decree, or simply not being mentioned at all. Due to the difficulties in determining what counts as a decree, no official list of them has ever been published, despite efforts post-independence to compile one.

After independence, the decrees were largely ignored by the new state. Although the Free State constitution stated that all laws in force at the creation of the state would remain in force, a court soon ruled that the decrees were not considered legislation. (Note: The King (Kelly) v. Maguire (1923)) Instead, this provision is considered to apply to the British legislation passed during this period. Additionally, members of the Executive Council avoided giving the decrees any sense of validity or importance when speaking in the Dáil.

== The 'list of 44' ==
The list of decrees below (known as the 'list of 44') was compiled in the early 1920s by an unknown person. Identical copies are in the National Archives of Ireland and the archives of University College Dublin. The systems of numbering used in the list were not in use for much of the life of the First Dáil, so were retrospectively added for the earlier entries.

The inclusion of some items in the list has been questioned. Some are far closer to political declarations or internal party decisions than legislation. Additionally, investigations by civil servants have concluded that several of the items were resolutions or ministerial orders, not decrees.

=== First Dáil ===
==== 1919 ====
File No.	Subject	Date	No. of decree
1	Declaration of Independence	21 January 1919	1/1919
2	Democratic Programme	21 January 1919	2/1919
3	Loan Issue	10 April 1919	3/1919
4	Establishment of Consular Services	18 June 1919	4/1919
5	Provision of Land	18 June 1919	5/1919
6	Afforestation	18 June 1919	6/1919
7	Fisheries	18 June 1919	7/1919
8	National Arbitration Courts	18 June 1919	8/1919
9	National Civil Service	18 June 1919	9/1919
10	Industrial Commission of Inquiry	18 June 1919	10/1919
11	Housing	19 June 1919	11/1919
12	Loan Issue in America	20 August 1919	12/1919
13	Oath of Allegiance	20 August 1919	13/1919

==== 1920 ====
File No.	Subject	Date	No. of decree
14	Election Campaign for the Presidency of U.S.A.	29 June 1920	1/1920
15	Consuls and Diplomatic Agents	29 June 1920	2/1920
16	Ambassador to Washington	29 June 1920	3/1920
17	Diplomatic Mission	29 June 1920	4/1920
18	Courts of Justice and Equity	29 June 1920	5/1920
19	Claims to Land	29 June 1920	6/1920
20	Income Tax	29 June 1920	7/1920
21	Closing of Loan Issue	29 June 1920	8/1920
22	Commission re Local Administration	29 June 1920	9/1920
23	Import and Export Company	29 June 1920	10/1920
24	Imposition of Political or Religious Tests	6 August 1920	11/1920
25	Organised Opposition to the Republic	6 August 1920	12/1920
26	Increase of Rent	6 August 1920	13/1920
27	Emigration from Ireland	6 August 1920	14/1920
28	Severance of connection with Local Government Board	17 September 1920	15/1920
29	Terms of Reference of Commission on Organised Opposition to the Republic	17 September 1920	16/1920
30	Non-recognition of Hostile Legislation	17 September 1920	17/1920
31	National Economic Council	17 September 1920	18/1920
32	National Land Commission	17 September 1920	19/1920

==== 1921 ====
File No.	Subject	Date	No. of decree
33	Local Government Code of Laws	25 January 1921	1/1921
34	Prohibition of Census	11 March 1921	2/1921
35	Increase of Rent and Mortgage Interest	11 March 1921	3/1921
36	Exclusion of British Goods	11 March 1921	4/1921
36a	Exclusion of British Goods (Supplemental)	10 May 1921	5/1921

=== Second Dáil ===
==== 1922 ====
File No.	Subject	Date	No. of decree
37	Registration of Births, Marriages and Deaths	1 March 1922	1/1922
38	Ard Fheis Agreement	2 March 1922	2/1922
39	General Election	20 May 1922	3/1922
40	Membership of Local Authorities	8 June 1922	4/1922
41	Limerick Night Watchmen	8 June 1922	5/1922
42	County Scheme — Temporary Provisions	8 June 1922	6/1922
43	Secondary Education	8 June 1922	7/1922
44	Workman's Compensation (War Addition) Extension	8 June 1922	8/1922

== Other decrees ==
There are several items that were not included in the 'list of 44', but could nonetheless be argued to be decrees:

Title or description	Date	Citation
Recognition Campaign ($1,000,000 authorised to be spent to obtain recognition by the US)	29 June 1920	
Informal decision on transfer of power in an emergency (Note: It was decided that if only five TDs remained free from British detention, the army (i.e. the IRA) should be authorised to form a provisional government. This never happened during the War of Independence. However, in 1938, seven surviving TDs from the Second Dáil who did not recognise the Irish Free State's legitimacy declared that they were vesting the powers of government in the IRA. This would be used to justify the existence and actions of the IRA for decades to come.)	11 March 1921	
Dáil Éireann Proclamation (local bodies to take no part in the Senate election)	28 April 1921	
Decision to accept the May 1921 elections as Dáil elections	10 May 1921	
Provisional Orders Decree	25 August 1921	
Decree to amend the Local Government Act of 1902	26 August 1921	
Appointment of a Registrar-Supervisor of Friendly Societies	26 August 1921	

== See also ==
- List of acts of the Oireachtas

== Sources ==
- Farrell, Brian (1975). "The Legislation of a 'Revolutionary' Assembly: Dáil Decrees 1919–1922". Irish Jurist. 10 (1): 112–127 – via JSTOR.
- Mohr, Thomas (February 2022). "The Strange Fate of the Dáil Decrees of Revolutionary Ireland, 1919–22". Statute Law Review. 43 (1): 120–137. doi:10.1093/slr/hmaa015. hdl:10197/12314 – via Oxford Academic.
