= Yvonne Burke =

Yvonne Burke may refer to:

- Yvonne Brathwaite Burke (born 1932), American politician and lawyer from California
- Yvonne Burke (Garda), (born 1970), Irish police (Garda Síochána) officer
