= Michael Manning (murderer) =

Irish murderer

- Born: 1 September 1928; Limerick, Ireland
- Died: 20 April 1954 (aged 25); Mountjoy Prison, Dublin, Ireland
- Status: Executed by hanging
- Conviction: Murder
- Penalty: Death

Details
- Victims: Catherine Cooper, 65
- Date: 18 November 1953
- Country: Ireland
- Date apprehended: 19 November 1953

Michael Manning (1 September 1928 – 20 April 1954) was an Irish man who was convicted for rape and murder and executed in 1954. He was the 29th and last person to be executed in the Republic of Ireland, as capital punishment was gradually abolished in the decades following Manning's execution.

== Murder and trial ==
Manning, a 25-year-old carter from Johnsgate in Limerick, was found guilty in February 1954 of the rape and murder of Catherine Cooper, a 65-year-old nurse who worked at Barringtons' Hospital in the city. Nurse Cooper's body was discovered on 18 November 1953 in the quarry under the New Castle, Dublin Road, Castletroy, where she was found to have choked on grass stuffed into her mouth to keep her from screaming during the commission of the crime.

Manning expressed remorse for the crime, which he did not deny. By his own account, he was making his way home on foot after a day's drinking in The Black Swan, Annacotty when he saw a woman he did not recognise, walking alone. "I suddenly lost my head and jumped on the woman and remember no more until the lights of a car shone on me." He took flight at this point but was arrested within hours, after his distinctive hat was found at the scene of the crime.

Although Manning made an impassioned plea for clemency in a letter to the Minister for Justice Gerald Boland, his request was denied, although it was supported by Nurse Cooper's family. The execution by hanging was duly carried out on 20 April 1954 in Mountjoy Prison, Dublin, by Albert Pierrepoint, who had travelled from Britain where he was one of three Senior Executioners.

Frank Prendergast, subsequently TD for Limerick East who knew Manning well, recalled later: "Friends of mine who worked with me, I was serving my time at the time, went up to visit him on the Sunday before he was hanged. And they went to Mass and Holy Communion together and they played a game of handball that day. He couldn't have been more normal."

Manning left a wife who was pregnant at the time of the murder. His body was buried in an unmarked grave in a yard at Mountjoy Prison.

== Aftermath ==
The death penalty was abolished in 1964 for all but the murder of Gardaí, diplomats and prison officers. It was abolished by statute for these remaining offences in 1990 and was finally expunged from the Constitution of Ireland by a referendum in 2001.
