= John Morley (Gaelic footballer) =

Irish Gaelic footballer (1942–1980)

Personal information
- Native name: Seán Ó Muraile (Irish)
- Born: 6 October 1942 Kiltimagh, County Mayo, Ireland
- Died: 7 July 1980 (aged 37) Loughglynn, County Roscommon, Ireland
- Occupation: Garda Síochána

Sport
- Sport: Gaelic football
- Position: Centre-back
Clubs
- Years: Club
- Kiltimagh; Ballaghaderreen
Club titles
- Mayo titles: 1
Inter-county
Years	County	Apps (scores)
1961–1974	Mayo	29 (1-04)
Inter-county titles
- Connacht titles: 2
- All-Irelands: 0
- NFL: 1
- All Stars: 0

John Francis Morley (6 October 1942 – 7 July 1980) was an Irish Gaelic footballer and Garda Síochána. His championship career at senior level with the Mayo county team spanned thirteen seasons from 1961 until 1974. Morley is widely regarded as one of Mayo's greatest ever players.

== Life and career ==
Born in Kiltimagh, County Mayo, Morley was educated locally and later attended St Jarlath's College in Tuam where he first played competitive football. Here he won back-to-back All-Ireland medals in 1960 and 1961.

At club level Morley first played at juvenile and underage levels with Kiltimagh before later lining out with a variety of clubs. His greatest success was with the Ballaghaderreen club with whom he won a county senior championship medal in 1972.

Morley made his debut on the inter-county scene at the age of seventeen when he was selected for the Mayo minor team in 1960. He enjoyed one championship season with the minor team which ended without success. He subsequently joined the Mayo senior team, making his debut during the 1961-62 league. Over the course of the next thirteen seasons, Morley enjoyed much success, winning Connacht medals in 1967 and 1969 and a National League medal in 1970. He played his last game for Mayo in June 1974.

After being chosen on the Connacht inter-provincial team for the first time in 1962, Morley was an automatic choice on the starting fifteen for almost a decade. During that time he won Railway Cup medals in 1967 and 1969.

== Death ==
Morley, who rose to the rank of detective in the Garda Síochána, was murdered on 7 July 1980 by alleged members of the Irish National Liberation Army (INLA) during a pursuit in the aftermath of a bank robbery near Loughglynn, County Roscommon. Morley's colleague, Henry Byrne, was also killed in the pursuit. The officers' deaths provoked national outrage. Three men were apprehended, convicted and sentenced to death for capital murder. Two of the sentences were later reduced to 40 years imprisonment while the third was overturned.

== Career statistics ==
Team	Season	National League			Connacht		All-Ireland		Total	
Team	Season	Division	Apps	Score	Apps	Score	Apps	Score	Apps	Score
Mayo	1961-62	Division 2	4	0-00	2	0-00	0	0-00	6	0-00
Mayo	1962-63	Division 2	7	0-02	1	0-00	0	0-00	8	0-02
Mayo	1963-64	Division 2	5	0-00	2	0-01	0	0-00	7	0-01
Mayo	1964-65	Division 2	3	0-00	2	0-00	0	0-00	5	0-00
Mayo	1965-66	Division 4A	2	0-00	3	0-00	0	0-00	5	0-00
Mayo	1966-67	Division 4A	5	0-00	3	0-01	1	0-00	9	0-01
Mayo	1967-68	Division 3A	5	0-00	2	0-00	0	0-00	7	0-00
Mayo	1968-69	Division 3A	9	1-01	3	0-01	1	0-00	13	1-02
Mayo	1969-70	Division 3A	10	0-00	1	0-00	0	0-00	11	0-00
Mayo	1970-71	Division 1B	9	0-01	2	0-00	0	0-00	11	0-01
Mayo	1971-72	Division 1B	9	0-00	3	0-00	0	0-00	12	0-00
Mayo	1972-73	Division 1B	7	0-00	2	1-01	0	0-00	9	1-01
Mayo	1973-74	Division 1B	7	0-01	1	0-00	0	0-00	8	0-01
Total			82	1-05	27	1-04	2	0-00	111	2-09

== Honours ==
St Jarlath's College

- All-Ireland Colleges Senior Football Championship (2): 1960, 1961
- Connacht Colleges Senior Football Championship (2): 1960, 1961

Ballaghaderreen

- Mayo Senior Football Championship (1): 1972
- Mayo Intermediate Football Championship (1): 1971 (c)

Mayo

- Connacht Senior Football Championship (2): 1967, 1969
- National Football League (1): 1969-70

Connacht

- Railway Cup (2): 1967, 1969

== See also ==
- Murder of Henry Byrne and John Morley
