= Second Dáil =

Dáil Éireann as it convened from 16 August 1921 until 8 June 1922

←	1st Dáil	3rd Dáil	→
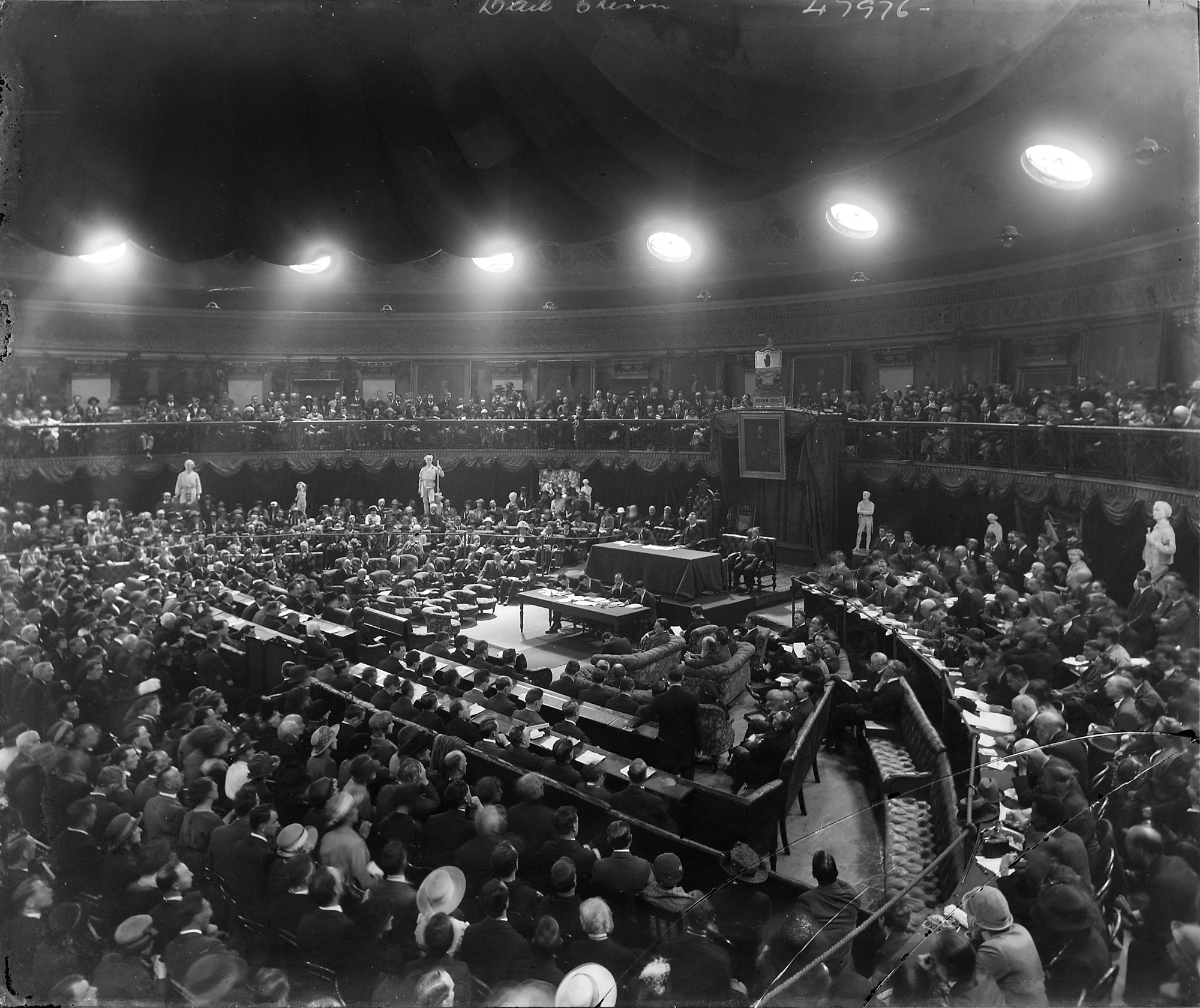
- The Second Dáil meets in the Mansion House, August 1921

Overview
- Legislative body: Dáil Éireann
- Jurisdiction: Irish Republic
- Meeting place: Mansion House, Dublin
- Term: 16 August 1921 – 16 June 1922
- Election: 1921 Irish elections
- Government: Government of the 2nd Dáil
- Members: 180 (128+52)
- Ceann Comhairle: Eoin MacNeill
- President of Dáil Éireann / President of the Irish Republic: Éamon de Valera (1921–22); Arthur Griffith (1922)

Sessions
- 1st: 16 August 1921 – 8 June 1922

The Second Dáil was Dáil Éireann as it convened from 16 August 1921 until 8 June 1922. From 1919 to 1922, Dáil Éireann was the revolutionary parliament of the self-proclaimed Irish Republic. The Second Dáil consisted of members elected at the 1921 elections, but with only members of Sinn Féin taking their seats. On 7 January 1922, it ratified the Anglo-Irish Treaty by 64 votes to 57 which ended the War of Independence and led to the establishment of the Irish Free State on 6 December 1922.

== 1921 election ==
Since 1919, those elected for Sinn Féin at the 1918 general election had abstained from the House of Commons and established Dáil Éireann as a parliament of a self-declared Irish Republic, with members calling themselves Teachtaí Dála or TDs. In December 1920, in the middle of the Irish War of Independence, the British Government passed the Government of Ireland Act, which enacted partition by establishing two home rule parliaments in separate parts of Ireland. These provisions arose out of discussions held at the Irish Convention held in 1917, from which Sinn Féin had abstained. In May 1921 the first elections to the House of Commons of Northern Ireland and the House of Commons of Southern Ireland were held, by means of the single transferable vote. On 10 May 1921, the Dáil passed a resolution that the elections scheduled to take place later in the month in both parts of the country would be "regarded as elections to Dáil Éireann".

In the elections for Southern Ireland, all seats were uncontested, with Sinn Féin winning 124 of the 128 seats, and Independent Unionists winning the four seats representing the Dublin University. In the election for Northern Ireland, the Ulster Unionist Party won 40 of the 52 seats, with Sinn Féin and the Nationalist Party winning 6 seats each. Of the six seats won by Sinn Féin in Northern Ireland, five were held by people who had also won seats in Southern Ireland; therefore when the Second Dáil met, there were 125 Sinn Féin TDs. (Note: The five TDs elected for two constituencies were Michael Collins, Éamon de Valera, Arthur Griffith, Seán Milroy and Eoin MacNeill.)

The Second Dáil responded favourably to the proposal from King George V on 22 June 1921 for a Truce, which became effective from noon on 11 July 1921. This was upheld by nearly all of the combatants while the months-long process of arranging a treaty got under way. The Truce allowed the Dáil to meet openly without fear of arrest for the first time since September 1919, when it had been banned and driven underground.

== The Treaty ==
During the Second Dáil the Irish Republic and the British Government of David Lloyd George agreed to hold peace negotiations. As President of Dáil Éireann (Príomh Aire, or literally First Minister) Éamon de Valera was the highest official in the Republic at this time but was notionally only the head of government. In August 1921, to strengthen his status in the negotiations, the Dáil amended the Dáil Constitution to grant him the title President of the Republic, and he thereby became head of state. The purpose of this change was to impress upon the British the Republican doctrine that the negotiations were between two sovereign states with delegates accredited by their respective heads of state: the British king and the Irish president.

On 14 September 1921, the Dáil ratified the appointment of Arthur Griffith, Michael Collins, Robert Barton, Eamonn Duggan and George Gavan Duffy as envoys plenipotentiary for the peace conference in England. Of the five, Collins, Griffith and Barton were members of the cabinet. These envoys eventually signed the Anglo-Irish Treaty on 6 December. Between the Truce and the signing of the Treaty the Second Dáil only sat on 10 days, and did not discuss in detail the options available to it. The debate on the Treaty started on 14 December, and continued for thirteen days of debate until 7 January 1922. On that date, the Dáil approved the treaty by 64 in favour to 57 against.

The Treaty Debates were the first publicly reported debate on what Sinn Féin felt that it had achieved and could achieve.In the vote in January 1921, the deputies who represented more than one constituency were each only permitted to vote once, but this would not have changed the outcome. As the leader of the anti-Treaty minority de Valera resigned as president. He allowed himself to be nominated again, but was defeated on a vote of 60–58. He was succeeded as president by Arthur Griffith. The anti-Treaty deputies continued to attend the Dáil, with de Valera becoming the first Leader of the Opposition in the Dáil.

The ratification specified by the Treaty was by "a meeting summoned for the purpose of the members elected to sit in the House of Commons of Southern Ireland". The Dáil vote did not fulfil this because four unionists were absent and one Northern Ireland member was present. The requisite approval came at a separate meeting on 14 January 1922 attended by the unionists and boycotted by anti-Treaty TDs. The meeting on 14 January also approved a Provisional Government led by Collins, which ran in parallel to Griffith's Dáil government and with overlapping membership. This meeting was not of the House of Commons of Southern Ireland itself, but merely of "the members elected to sit in" it. The Government of Ireland Act 1920 required the Commons to be summoned by the Lord Lieutenant and its members to take an oath of allegiance to the king, whereas the meeting on 14 January was summoned by Griffith and the members present did not take an oath.

== Supersession and Republican continuation ==
Under the terms of the Treaty, a Constituent Assembly was to be elected to draft a Constitution for the Irish Free State to take effect by 6 December 1922. The assembly would also serve as a "Provisional Parliament" to hold the Provisional Government responsible. This election was held on 16 June pursuant to both a resolution by the Second Dáil on 20 May and a proclamation by the Provisional Government on 27 May. The Dáil resolution also approved a pact agreed by Collins and de Valera in a vain attempt to prevent the Treaty split leading to Civil War. The pact was to have at the election "a National Coalition Panel for this Third Dáil, representing both Parties in the Dáil, and in the Sinn Féin Organisation". On 8 June 1922, the Second Dáil "adjourned to Friday, 30th June, 1922". The pact negotiators envisaged that the Second Dáil would meet on 30 June and formally appoint the Third Dáil as its successor. The Provisional Government proclamation called for an election "pursuant to the provisions of" the Irish Free State (Agreement) Act, 1922 (passed by the Westminster Parliament in April) and naming 1 July 1922 for the first meeting of the Provisional Parliament. The outbreak of Civil War hostilities on 28 June meant the 30 June meeting did not happen and the 1 July meeting was repeatedly postponed by the Provisional Government until 9 September. By then, Collins and Griffith were dead and the Dáil government and Provisional Government had been merged under William T. Cosgrave. The preamble to the 9 September meeting cited the 27 May proclamation but not the 20 May resolution. On 6 December the Constitution and Free State came into effect, the Provisional Government became the Free State's Executive Council and the Provisional Parliament became the lower house of the Free State's Oireachtas (parliament). The Civil War lasted until May 1923.

De Valera during the Civil War, and other republican theorists in later years, argued that the Second Dáil remained in existence as the legitimate parliament of a continuing Irish Republic. Whereas, in the Westminster system, a dissolution of parliament always precedes a general election and terminates the term of the existing parliament and the next meeting of newly elected members is considered to be the start of a new parliament, this convention was explicitly (Note: On 10 May 1921, the First Dáil passed a resolution, "That the Parliamentary elections which are to take place during the present month be regarded as elections to Dáil Eireann" and "That the present Dáil dissolve automatically as soon as the new body has been summoned by the President and called to order". Accordingly, when the newly returned TDs first assembled that August, the Speaker yielded the chair to de Valera, who said "Until the moment the Speaker left the Chair, the old Dáil was in session. The new Dáil is in session now.") broken by the transition from the First Dáil to the Second Dáil (which effectively opted for the Continental European system where the term of the old Parliament continues all the way until the first meeting of the new one, albeit without adopting the Continental European nomenclature that a dissolution merely triggers a snap election without ending the old Parliament's term), and implicitly by the transition provisions agreed in May–June 1922. In both cases, TDs wanted to guard against a breach in continuity which would happen if the old Dáil had been dissolved but the envisaged election then failed to occur because of a deteriorating security situation. The fact that no explicit transfer of authority took place allowed republicans to claim the Second Dáil remained in existence and that the new constituent assembly/provisional parliament was illegitimate and its name "Third Dáil" a misnomer. (Note: The pact resolution had also said "That constituencies where an election is not held shall continue to be represented by their present Deputies", which de Valera suggested could be interpreted as including not just constituencies where candidates were returned unopposed, but also Northern Ireland constituencies excluded from the election under the terms of the Treaty. Therefore, if Northern Ireland TDs were refused entry to the Third Dáil, that would violate the pact and prove its illegitimacy. This point was never tested.) If the Third Dáil was illegitimate, then so was the Free State constitution enacted by it, and the Free State itself. On this basis anti-Treaty TDs abstained from taking seats in the Third Dáil. A few symbolic secret meetings of the continuing "Second Dáil" were attended by anti-Treaty TDs, the first in October 1922 appointing a republican government under de Valera. In 1924 de Valera formed Comhairle na dTeachtaí to replenish the diminishing numbers of Second Dáil TDs elected in 1921 with Sinn Féin abstentionists returned at the general elections of 1922 and of 1923. T. Ryle Dwyer characterised this as recognising the Second Dáil as the de jure authority, Comhairle na dTeachtai as the "de jure de facto" authority, and the Free State Oireachtas as the "de facto de facto" authority.

In 1925 an anti-Treaty IRA convention withdrew its allegiance from the republican government to its own Army Council. Second Dáil TDs had taken an oath of fidelity to the Irish Republic, and Sinn Féin regarded those who implicitly or explicitly endorsed the Treaty or Free State constitution as having violated this oath and thereby vacated their seats. In 1926 de Valera founded Fianna Fáil to take a more pragmatic opposition than Sinn Féin to the Free State, and the following year the party abandoned abstentionism by entering the Free State Dáil. Fianna Fáil TD Seán Lemass famously described it in March 1928 as "a slightly constitutional party". De Valera came to power in 1932 and in 1937 proposed a new Constitution which was adopted by plebiscite, removing to his own satisfaction any remaining reservations about the state's legitimacy. In December 1938, seven of those elected in 1921 who continued to regard the Second Dáil as the last legitimate Dáil assembly, and that all other surviving members had disqualified themselves by taking the oath of allegiance, gathered at a meeting with the IRA Army Council under Seán Russell, and signed over what they believed was the authority of the Government of Dáil Éireann to the Army Council until such a time as a new Dáil could once again be democratically elected by all the people of Ireland in all 32 counties. (Note: The seven were John J. O'Kelly, George Noble Plunkett, William Stockley, Mary MacSwiney, Brian O'Higgins, Tom Maguire and Cathal Ó Murchadha.) Henceforth, the IRA Army Council perceived itself to be the legitimate government of the Irish Republic. Official Sinn Féin in 1969–70 and Provisional Sinn Féin in 1986 abandoned abstentionism and began a gradual de facto recognition of the legitimacy of the modern Irish state; the smaller Republican Sinn Féin retains the view that the Second Dáil was the last legitimate Irish legislature.

== See also ==
- List of decrees of the First and Second Dáils
- Members of the 2nd Dáil
- History of Ireland
- First Dáil
