= Kevin Kiely =

Irish politician (died 2026)

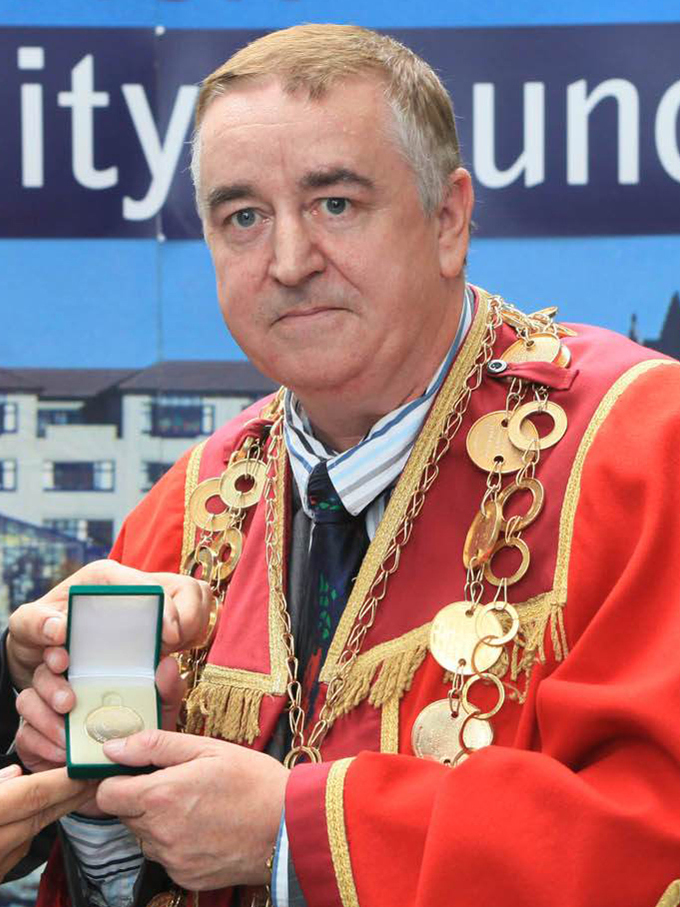
- Kiely in 2009 in the robes of the Mayor of Limerick

Mayor of Limerick
- In office 2009–2010

Personal details
- Born: 1961 or 1962
- Died: 12 March 2026 (aged 64) Limerick, Ireland
- Party: Independent
- Other political affiliations: Fine Gael (until 2011)

Kevin Kiely (1961 or 1962 – 12 March 2026) was an Irish politician and Mayor of Limerick from 2009 to 2010. He was made a Peace Commissioner in 1983 by the then Fine Gael Minister for Justice, Michael Noonan. He was a member of Fine Gael.

== Career in politics ==
Kiely was first elected to Limerick City Council in 1985. He was re-elected to the council in June 2009. He was a member of the Governing Authority of the University of Limerick. He was Chairman of Limerick City Council Joint Policing and a former Chairman of Limerick City Council Future Planning. He was married with two children. In November 2009, he called for unemployed European Union nationals to be deported from Ireland. His views led to a debate over racism. This was part of a broader controversy surrounding racist comments from Fine Gael members in Limerick.

In March 2010, he called for a change to the law which bans selling alcohol on Good Friday and Christmas Day, at a time when a rugby match was due to take place in Limerick city. Shortly before leaving office in June 2010, he again was the subject of national news when he called for the re-introduction of capital punishment.

== Departure from Fine Gael ==
Kiley left Fine Gael, over the party's failure to select him as a candidate for the 2011 Irish general election. He unsuccessfully ran as an Independent candidate for the constituency of Limerick City.

== Death ==
Kiely died at a hospice in Limerick from complications of Parkinson's disease on 12 March 2026, aged 64.
