= Murder of Michael Reynolds =

1975 event in Dublin, Ireland

Michael Joseph Reynolds (9 February 1945 – 11 September 1975) was a member of the Garda Síochána, who was posthumously awarded the Scott Medal for bravery after being fatally wounded in pursuit of bank robbers operating on behalf of the Official IRA.

== Shooting at St. Anne's Park ==
A native of Kilconnell, Ballinasloe, Reynolds was a member of the Garda Síochána, who, following an armed robbery at the Bank of Ireland, Killester, Dublin, on the afternoon of 11 September 1975 gave chase unarmed to a robbery gang bearing firearms linked to the Official IRA, who made off with £7000 in a getaway car, narrowly avoiding a collision with Reynolds' private car in the process.

"Believing the car to have been stolen, Reynolds went in pursuit, the chase eventually reaching speeds of sixty miles per hour through a maze of Dublin suburbs. The four raiders abandoned the car at St. Anne's Park, Raheny, and attempted to continue their flight on foot still hotly pursued by Garda Reynolds who had driven into the Park almost immediately behind them. Reynolds, who was unarmed, seized and dragged to the ground the nearest of the robbers who, burdened with their loot, were now beginning to tire. On seeing their comrade in Reynolds' hands one of the robbers called in vain for the Garda to release the man, and, when he did not do so, the robber shot Reynolds in the head."

== Aftermath ==
Reynolds died in hospital under two hours later. Two of the raiders, Marie and Noel Murray, initially sentenced to death, were subsequently sentenced to life imprisonment.

== See also ==
- List of Irish police officers killed in the line of duty
- Garda ar Lár
- Yvonne Burke
- Michael Noel Canavan
- Deaths of Henry Byrne and John Morley (1980)
- Murder of Jerry McCabe (1996)
- Death of Adrian Donohoe (2013)

== Sources ==
- An Garda Síochána and the Scott Medal, p. 175, Gerard O'Brien, Four Courts Press, 2008; ISBN 978-1-84682-124-0
