= Pat Farrell (disambiguation) =

Pat or Patricia Farrell may refer to:

- Pat Farrell, chief executive of the Irish Banking Federation and former Irish senator
- Pat Farrell, Franciscan nun, the head of the Leadership Conference of Women Religious in the USA
- Patricia Farrell (darts player), in WDF Asia-Pacific Cup

== See also ==
- Patrick Farrell (disambiguation)
