= John Martin Cafferky =

Scott Medal recipient (born 1947)

John Martin Cafferky, Garda 17328C, recipient of the Scott Medal, born 30 July 1947.

A native of Keel, Achill, County Mayo, Cafferky was one of a number of Guards who arrived at the scene of a burning terraced house in Ballyfermot on 10 September 1972. A number of persons been trapped on the top floor, Cafferky entered though the blaze to effect their rescue. A colleague who accompanied him into the hallway was driven back by the intense heat and thick smoke.

Cafferky located an elderly man in a back bedroom and led him to safety. However, one man, an invalid, remained trapped in a front room. Cafferky re-entered and breaking open a window, with the help of Garda Moolick got the man out the window safely. However, Cafferky was himself now trapped and was forced to jump for his life from the blaze.

He was awarded the Scott Silver Medal at Templemore Training Centre in November 1973. He continued to serve in the Dublin area, retiring on 20 April 1981.
