= Manus Patten =

Irish police officer (1902–1977)

Manus Patten (12 August 1902–20 June 1977) was an Irish police officer (Garda 4576), who was a recipient of the Scott Medal.

Patten was a native of Derreans, Achill Sound, County Mayo, joining the Garda Síochána on 31 May 1923.

During the early hours of 26 December 1938, in Ballina, a fire broke out at Pearse Street, home and business premises of a J J Duncan. Garda Patten alerted the inhabitants of the houses on either side of Duncan's, then made his way to the upper floor of the building. He located four distressed members of the family, and urged them down the stairs, as the house was now well ablaze. However, when outside, he learned there were still more people in the house, and ran back up the burning stairs to find a barely conscious husband and wife, who he escorted outside. He was then informed that Mr Duncan could not be located; by now suffering from smoke inhalation, Patten made a third entry into the building, spending several minutes in an increasingly toxic environment in a vain search for Duncan. He had to be dragged from the premises himself, just as the ceiling collapsed. J J Duncan's remains were later found in the ruins.

Garda Patten was awarded the Scott Silver Medal on 11 December 1939. He continued in the Mayo Division until his retirement on 20 July 1965.
