= Comhairle na dTeachtaí =

Irish republican parliament, 1921–1927

Comhairle na dTeachtaí (Irish pronunciation: [ˈkoːɾˠl̠ʲə n̪ˠə ˈdʲaxt̪ˠiː]; "Council of Deputies") was an Irish republican parliament established by opponents of the 1921 Anglo-Irish Treaty and the resulting Irish Free State, and viewed by republican legitimatists as a successor to the Second Dáil. Members were abstentionist from the 3rd Dáil established by the pro-Treaty faction. Just as the First Dáil established a parallel Irish Republic in opposition to the British Dublin Castle administration, so Comhairle na dTeachtaí attempted to establish a legitimatist government in opposition to the Provisional Government and Government of the Irish Free State established by the 3rd Dáil. This legitimatist government, called the Council of State, had Éamon de Valera as president. In 1926 de Valera resigned as president, left the Sinn Féin party and founded Fianna Fáil, which in 1927 entered the Fourth Dáil. Comhairle na dTeachtaí, never more than a symbolic body, was thereby rendered defunct.

Fianna Fáil members spoke at a Comhairle na dTeachtaí meeting in December 1926, whose minutes were discovered in a 1928 raid on Cumann na mBan headquarters and published in 1930 by the Cumann na nGaedheal government. Cumann na nGaedheal TDs quoted from this document that year to cast aspersions on Fianna Fáil's commitment to the Free State constitution. Patrick McGilligan quoted from it in 1932 to oppose Fianna Fáil's proposed withholding of land annuities, and again in 1947 opposing the Sinn Féin Funds Bill.

== See also ==
- Irish republican legitimism
- Comhairle na Poblachta, 1929 republican group
