= Stan Tormey =

Australian rules footballer (1916–1971)

Personal information
- Full name: Stanley Francis Tormey
- Born: 10 July 1916; Essendon, Victoria
- Died: 8 August 1971 (aged 55); Parkville, Victoria
- Original team: Carlton CYMS (CYMSFA)
- Height: 179 cm (5 ft 10 in)
- Weight: 76 kg (168 lb)

Playing career^{1}
| Years | Club | Games (Goals) |
| 1941–43 | St Kilda | 31 (2) |
- ^{1} Playing statistics correct to the end of 1943.

Stanley Francis Tormey (10 July 1916 – 8 August 1971) was an Australian rules footballer who played with the St Kilda Football Club in the Victorian Football League (VFL) (VFL) and both the Sandringham Football Club and the Prahran Football Club in the Victorian Football Association (VFA).

== Family ==
The son of Joseph Francis "Frank" Tormey (1891–1949), and Margaret Pearl Tormey (1889–1963), née Eddy, Stanley Francis Tormey was born at Essendon, Victoria on 10 July 1916.

He married Mabel Dorothy Sykes, later known as Hardman, in 1943.

== Football ==
Cleared from Carlton C.Y.M.S. to Melbourne High School Old Boys Football Club in the Victorian Amateur Football Association (VAFA) in May 1935. He played with West St Kilda C.Y.M.S. (and was the club's best and fairest) in 1937 and with Myer's, in the VAFA in 1938.

=== Sandringham (VFA) ===
He made his debut for Sandringham in the VFA, against Brighton, on 20 April 1940.

=== St Kilda (VFL) ===
Tormey played for St Kilda while serving in the Australian Army during World War II.

=== Prahran (VFA) ===
Cleared from St Kilda on 8 May 1946, he made his debut for to Prahran, in the VFA, against Brighton on 11 May 1946.

== Military service ==
He served with the Second AIF from August 1940 to February 1946.

== Death ==
He died at Parkville, Victoria on 8 August 1971.
