= Statute Law Review =

- Discipline: Law
- Language: English
- Edited by: Constantin Stefanou and Helen Xanthaki

Publication details
- History: 1980
- Publisher: Oxford University Press (United Kingdom)

Standard abbreviations
- ISO 4: Statute Law Rev.

Indexing
- ISSN: 0144-3593 (print); 1464-3863 (web)

Links
- Journal homepage

Statute Law Review is a peer-reviewed academic journal of law. It is published by Oxford University Press.

It was previously edited by Daniel Greenberg. As of 2026, its editors in chief are Constantin Stefanou and Helen Xanthaki.
