= Marie and Noel Murray =

Irish anarchist spouses convicted of murder

Marie and Noel Murray were an anarchist married couple who were among the last people to be sentenced to death in the Republic of Ireland. The couple were convicted of capital murder and sentenced to death in June 1976 for the murder of Garda Michael Reynolds the previous September. The sentences led to an outcry and a campaign to stop the executions received international attention. The sentences were quashed and the pair were convicted of common murder. They were both released in 1992.

== Biographies ==
Marie and Noel Murray were both activists with a history of involvement in left-wing and republican politics. Both had been members of Sinn Féin. When Sinn Féin split into the left-wing "Official" and nationalist "Provisional" factions in 1970, they both joined the Officials. It was during this time that they met and married. They both left Official Sinn Féin in 1973. They remained active politically and were involved in an anarchist group, along with a number of former members of the Officials. They were involved in campaigns for improving prisoners’ rights, promoting the Irish language and the Housing Action Committee. At the time of the arrests, Marie had been working as a junior civil servant. Noel had been working as a metal fabricator. Marie was 27 at the time of the convictions and Noel was 26.

== Arrest and conviction ==
On 11 September 1975, a Bank of Ireland branch in the Dublin suburb of Killester was robbed at gunpoint. Witnesses stated that two men and a woman had carried out the deed before fleeing in a getaway car. An off-duty Garda named Michael Reynolds (30, from County Galway), happened to be driving by at the time and gave chase. The assailants fled their vehicles at Saint Anne's Park and Garda Reynolds continued the pursuit on foot. According to the official verdict, Marie Murray shot Reynolds in the head as he closed in on them. The gang got away. Garda Reynolds died two hours later in hospital.

Following the incident, numerous raids were carried out on known republicans and leftists. Noel and Marie Murray, along with Ronan Stenson, were eventually charged with the murder of Reynolds. They were tried by Justice Denis Pringle at the Special Criminal Court. They were convicted of capital murder on 9 June 1976 and sentenced to death.

== Opposition to sentences ==
The conviction gained attention across the country as nobody had been executed in Ireland in twenty-two years. The death penalty had been abolished in 1964 for all crimes except the murder of police and prison officers.

The 'Murray Defence Committee' was established to coordinate opposition to the sentences. Its aim was to secure a retrial for the Murrays before the sentence could be carried out. It wanted the death penalty to be fully abolished in the Republic of Ireland. As a result of their efforts, the campaign became a cause célèbre and achieved international attention. Among those who pleaded with the Irish government to commute the sentences were British MPs Neil Kinnock and David Steel, US congresswoman Bella Abzug, French philosopher Jean-Paul Sartre and Pope Paul VI.

It was not just the harsh nature of the sentences that caused such opposition. It was believed by many that there was not enough evidence to convict the couple at all. The trial had been conducted without a jury and both Noel and Marie claimed that the statements they gave confessing to the murder had been obtained by torture. Stenson, who was released, also claimed to have been tortured. It was alleged that the pair had been scapegoated because the state could not let the murder of a Garda go unpunished. Left-wing opponents further alleged that there was a political motive to the sentencing. That is, the government wanted to show that it was tough on terrorism in the context of the Troubles in Northern Ireland and that it wanted to intimidate opponents of the government's own economic policies at a time of high unemployment and discontent.

== Re-sentencing and imprisonment ==
In November 1976, Noel Murray's capital murder conviction was quashed by the Supreme Court and substituted for one of common murder for which he received a life sentence. The following year Marie Murray was retried and found guilty of common murder. She too received a life sentence. Although they were both still found to be guilty of Garda Reynold's murder, they did not receive the death penalty as Garda Reynolds was off-duty and not in uniform. As such, it was argued, they could not have known that Reynolds was a police officer.

Both Noel and Marie were released in 1992, having served 17 years. Prior to their release, they had been involved in an unsuccessful ten-year legal action to receive conjugal visits so that they could start a family. In 1991 the Supreme Court ruled that the Constitutional right to beget children within marriage was suspended while a spouse was lawfully imprisoned.

== See also ==
- Anarchism in Ireland
- Capital punishment in Ireland
