= Roland Tormey =

Irish sociologist

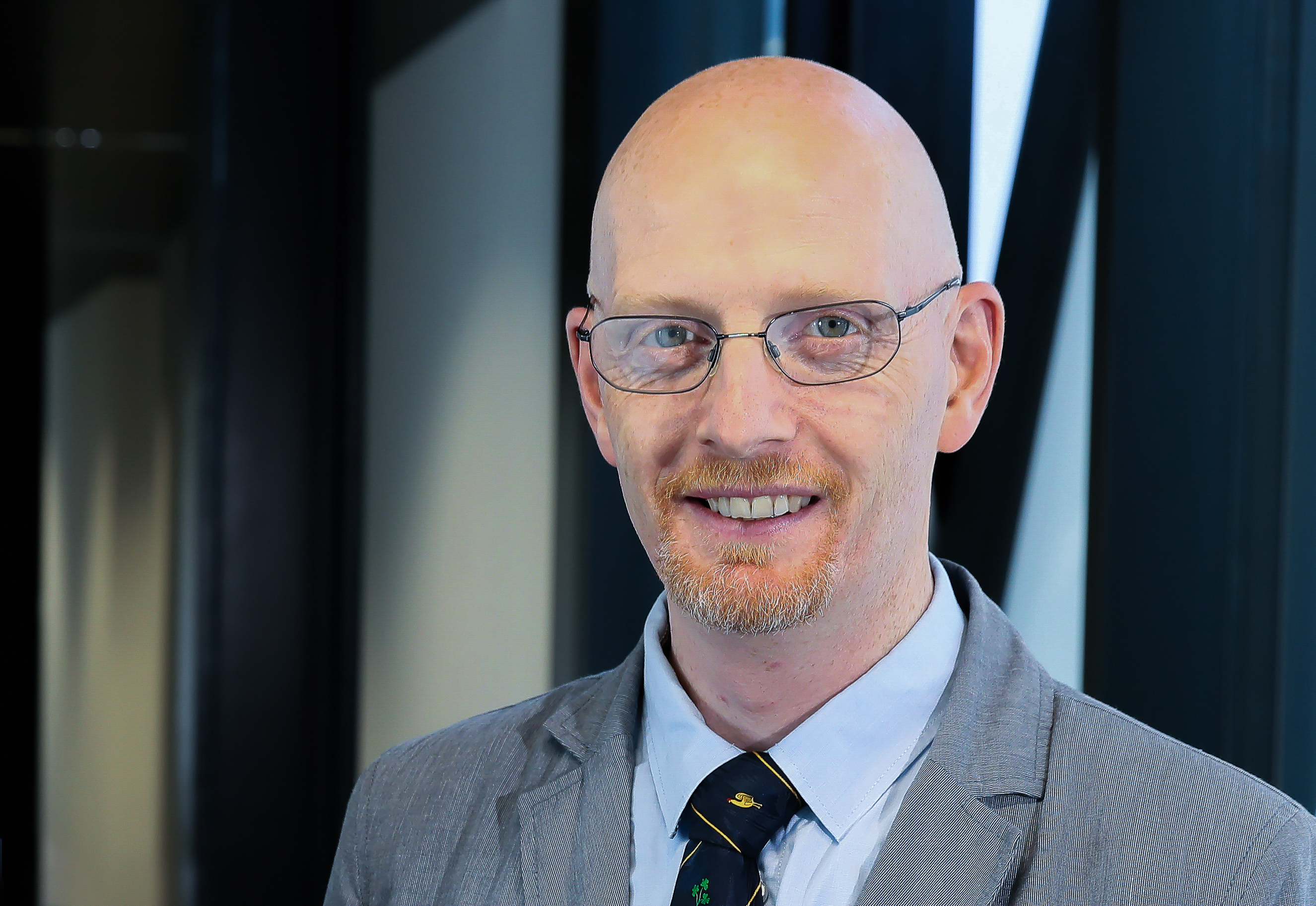
- Roland Tormey in 2016
- Born: 1971 (age 54–55); Dublin
- Known for: Teacher education research Educational evaluation Engineering ethics

Academic background
- Education: Sociology
- Alma mater: University College Dublin; Trinity College Dublin
- Thesis: The part-time soul : case studies in the management of culture and flexibility in Irish retail (2011)
- Doctoral advisor: James Wickham

Academic work
- Discipline: Sociology
- Sub-discipline: Intercultural education Teacher education
- Institutions: EPFL (École Polytechnique Fédérale de Lausanne)
- Main interests: Intercultural education Teacher education Emotions in Teaching and Learning; Student learning in team-based projects Engineering ethics
- Website: https://www.epfl.ch/education/teaching/teaching-support/research-and-innovation/

Roland Tormey (born 1971 in Dublin) is an Irish sociologist, teacher, researcher and curriculum developer. He is the head of Teaching Support Centre at EPFL's (École Polytechnique Fédérale de Lausanne) College of Humanities.

== Career ==
Tormey studied sociology and social administration at the University College Dublin and earned his bachelor's degree in 1992. He then enrolled in a PhD in sociology and joined James Wickham at the Trinity College Dublin. He graduated in 2000 with a thesis on "The Part-Time Soul: Case Studies in the Management of Culture and Flexibility in Irish Retail." At the London South Bank University he earned a postgraduate certificate in development and environmental education in 2000. From 1996 to 2004 he was a lecturer in sociology at Mary Immaculate College at the University of Limerick, before moving to the Department of Education and Professional Studies at University of Limerick, where he become Department Head in 2009.

Since 2011, he has worked at EPFL, where he teaches and researches in learning sciences and engineering education and is head of the Teaching Support Centre.

== Research ==
While at University of Limerick and at the Mary Immaculate College Tormey's research focus lay on the representation of ethnicity and national identity in school curricula, which contributed to the development of the Irish National Intercultural Education Guidelines for Irish Primary and Post-primary schools; the pedagogy of social sciences, where he studied the development of social scientific thinking in upper secondary school students and was instrumental in the development of Irish national syllabus for Sociology and Political Science; and emotional intelligence and emotional competences in initial teacher education. This work highlighted the emotional demands on student teachers as well as calling into question numerous pre-existing assumptions about teacher emotional intelligence and about the relationship between measured emotional intelligence and teacher performance .

His current research is focused on evidence-informed approaches to science, technology, engineering, and mathematics (STEM) teacher learning at universities; the development of meta-cognition in students transitioning into STEM; and the impact of gender on group work experiences of engineering students. An emerging research area Tormey peruses is the study of emotions in engineering ethics education.

His research was featured in the Swiss television RTS and at the French CRI.

== Distinctions ==
Tormey is a member of the board of directors of the European Society for Engineering Education (SEFI; elected in 2020), member of the board of directors of Global Schoolroom (since 2013), and co-chair of the SEFI Engineering Ethics Special Interest Group (since 2019). He was previously a member of the board of the Swiss Faculty Development Network (SFDN; 2016–2020). He has represented Ireland on the United Nations Economic Commission for Europe (UNECE) steering committee and task force on the decade of education for sustainable development and was co-chair of the UNECE Expert Group on Competences in ESD from 2009 to 2011.

== Selected works ==
- Corcoran, Roisin P.; Tormey, Roland (2013). "Does emotional intelligence predict student teachers' performance?". Teaching and Teacher Education. 35: 34–42. doi:10.1016/j.tate.2013.04.008.
- Corcoran, Roisin P.; Tormey, Roland (2012). "How emotionally intelligent are pre-service teachers?". Teaching and Teacher Education. 28 (5): 750–759. doi:10.1016/j.tate.2012.02.007.
- Corcoran, Roisin P.; Tormey, Roland (2012). Developing Emotionally Competent Teachers: Emotional Intelligence and Pre-service Teacher Education. ISBN 978-3-0343-0786-4.
- Tormey, Roland; Henchy, Deirdre (2008). "Re-imagining the traditional lecture: An action research approach to teaching student teachers to 'do' philosophy". Teaching in Higher Education. 13 (3): 303–314. doi:10.1080/13562510802045337. S2CID 73637131.
- Tormey, Roland (2006). "The construction of national identity through primary school history: The Irish case". British Journal of Sociology of Education. 27 (3): 311–324. doi:10.1080/01425690600750494. S2CID 145268027.
- Corcoran, Róisín; Tormey, Roland (2010). "Teacher education, emotional competencies and development education". Procedia - Social and Behavioral Sciences. 2 (2): 2448–2457. doi:10.1016/j.sbspro.2010.03.352. S2CID 143541425.
- Raca, Mirko; Tormey, Roland; Dillenbourg, Pierre (2014). "Sleepers' lag - study on motion and attention". Proceedins of the Fourth International Conference on Learning Analytics and Knowledge - LAK '14. pp. 36–43. doi:10.1145/2567574.2567581. ISBN 9781450326643. S2CID 8900585.
- Tormey, Roland; Gleeson, Jim (2012). "Irish post-primary students' attitudes towards ethnic minorities". Irish Educational Studies. 31 (2): 157–173. doi:10.1080/03323315.2012.676234. S2CID 145647918.
