= Irish republican legitimism =

Political position within Irish republicanism

Irish republican legitimism denies the legitimacy of the political entities of the Republic of Ireland and Northern Ireland and posits that the pre-partition Irish Republic continues to exist. It is a more extreme form of Irish republicanism, which denotes rejection of all British rule in Ireland. The concept shapes aspects of, but is not synonymous with, abstentionism.

== Historical development ==
Republican legitimists adopt a traditional Irish republican analysis that views the Irish Republic as proclaimed "in arms" during the 1916 Easter Rising as the sole legitimate authority on the island of Ireland. This view is partly shared by all significant political parties in the present-day Republic of Ireland, who believe the secessionist and abstentionist First Dáil, which "ratified" the Republic proclaimed in 1916, is a predecessor to the current, internationally recognised, Dáil, the lower house of the Irish Parliament.

It is on the issue of the 1921 Anglo-Irish Treaty that republican legitimism departs from mainstream constitutional understanding. It views the Anglo-Irish Treaty as incompatible with the Irish Republic and thus null and void. Although the Treaty was endorsed by the majority of TDs of the Second Dáil, republican legitimists argue that the vote was invalid as all TDs had, prior to their election, taken a solemn oath to defend the Irish Republic, and that people could not possibly express their true desires on the treaty, as the British Prime Minister David Lloyd George claimed that an "immediate and terrible war" would occur if it was not accepted.

On the basis of these views, republican legitimism argued that:

- all Irish parliaments convened since the Second Dáil in 1921 are illegitimate as they were established by a piece of British legislation, the Irish Free State (Agreement) Act 1922. (Note: This applies directly in the case of the 3rd Dáil; by proxy of the Constitution of the Irish Free State enacted by the 3rd Dáil in the cases of the 4th Dáil to 9th Dáil; and by proxy of both the Constitution of the Irish Free State and the current Constitution of Ireland enacted by the 9th Dáil for the 10th Dáil and all subsequent Dáils.)
- The First Dáil passed a resolution which provided that if enemy action ever succeeded in preventing the Dáil from functioning democratically, the Army should have the power to proclaim an Emergency Government;
- the 64 TDs who voted for the Treaty in 1922 had violated their oath to the Irish Republic and abdicated their legitimacy;
- The Second Dáil had never formally dissolved itself.

The pro- and anti-treaty factions of Sinn Féin attempted to present a united block of candidates for the 1922 general election in the 26 counties for the 3rd Dáil; 58 pro-treaty Sinn Féin members were re-elected compared with 36 anti-treaty members. Of these, 17 of the 58 and 16 of the 36 were returned unopposed. Following the outbreak of the Irish Civil War, the Second Dáil was never dissolved. Led by Éamon de Valera and others, the Second Dáil TDs who had voted against the Treaty abstained from the (26-county) Provisional Parliament of the Free State and the subsequent Oireachtas of the Irish Free State. They and their opponents engaged in the Irish Civil War in 1922–23.

Although de Valera had resigned as President of the Republic on 7 January 1922, and had not been re-elected on a very close Dáil vote two days later, a meeting of the IRA Army Executive at Poulatar, Ballybacon on 17 October 1922 adopted a proclamation "reinstating" de Valera as "President of the Republic" and "Chief Executive of the State". The "Emergency Government", as de Valera called it in his autobiography, was established on 25 October 1922.

Members of this Republican government were:

- Éamon de Valera - "President of the Republic" (after his arrest in 1923, substituted by Patrick J. Ruttledge)
- Robert Barton - "Minister for Economic Affairs"
- Liam Mellows - "Minister for Defence"
- Seán T. O'Kelly - "Minister for Local Government"
- P. J. Ruttledge - "Minister of Home Affairs"
- Austin Stack - "Minister of Finance"

De Valera also appointed twelve members of the Second Dáil to act as a Council of State. They were:

- Robert Barton (who had signed the Treaty) — chairman of the Agricultural Credit Corporation from 1934 to 1954
- Michael Colivet — did not join Fianna Fáil, for he refused to take the Oath of Allegiance
- Laurence Ginnell — died 1923
- Mary MacSwiney — signed 1938 statement
- Seán Moylan — joined Fianna Fáil in 1926
- Kathleen O'Callaghan
- Seán Ó Ceallaigh (John J. O'Kelly) — signed 1938 statement
- Seán T. O'Kelly — helped to found Fianna Fáil in 1926
- Seán O'Mahony — remained with Sinn Féin after the 1926 split; died 1934
- Count Plunkett — signed 1938 statement
- P. J. Ruttledge — helped to found Fianna Fáil in 1926
- Austin Stack — remained with Sinn Féin after the 1926 split; died 1929

This "Government of the Republic", however, was unable to assert the authority it claimed to possess. Effectively an internal government-in-exile, one of its first acts was to rescind the ratification of the Anglo-Irish Treaty. It continued to meet even after subsequent elections had been held in jurisdiction of the Free State. Styling themselves Comhairle na dTeachtaí, the members of the rump Second Dáil were joined by anti-Treaty republican TDs elected at subsequent elections. The IRA initially recognised the authority of the rump Second Dáil but increased distrust between the two bodies led the IRA to withdraw its support in 1925.

At the 1926 Sinn Féin Ard Fheis, Éamon de Valera (then president of the party) effectively called for the tactical abandonment of the legitimist argument by proposing that the party accept the Free State constitution and return to electoral politics contingent on the abolition of the Oath of Allegiance to the Crown. Opponents of the proposal, led by Father Michael O'Flanagan and Mary MacSwiney, defeated his motion by a vote of 223 to 218. De Valera subsequently resigned as Sinn Féin president to form a new party, Fianna Fáil, which entered the Dáil of the Irish Free State in 1927, reducing the ranks of this rump Second Dáil even further. From this point onwards, de Valera and his followers were seen as having departed from the principles of republicanism by republican legitimists, who set up Comhairle na Poblachta as a body to popularise its claims.

However, on 14 March 1929, de Valera made a remarkable statement in the Free State Parliament:

"I still hold that our right to be regarded as the legitimate Government of this country is faulty, that this house itself is faulty - you have secured a de facto position." He accused the Free State of having brought off a coup d'état in the summer of 1922 and stated:

"Those who have continued on in that organisation which we have left can claim exactly the same continuity that we claimed up to 1925. They can do it..."

== 1938 – Second Dáil to Army Council ==
The adoption of the 1937 Constitution changed the name of the state from "Irish Free State" to "Ireland", but legitimists continued to use the obsolete "Free State" to refer derisively to the regime it considered illegitimate; a practice continued past the Republic of Ireland Act 1948 and down to the present day.

The 17 December 1938 issue of the Wolfe Tone Weekly carried a statement from a body calling itself the Executive Council of the Second Dáil. Above this statement was an introductory paragraph written by Seán Russell announcing that on 8 December, the anniversary of the executions of the "Four Martyrs" (Rory O'Connor, Liam Mellows, Richard Barrett and Joe McKelvey) in 1922, the group had transferred what they believed was their authority as Government of the Irish Republic to the IRA Army Council. The statement was published in both Irish and English and appeared below the banner headline "IRA take over the Government of the Republic".

The legalistic basis for this transfer of authority was a resolution of the First Dáil on 11 March 1921 in response to the arrest of many TDs during the Irish War of Independence. Rather than nominate substitute members, Plunkett had said "it was usual to substitute military dictatorship in countries invaded", and the Dáil decided that "when the number [of TDs] fell to five the Army [IRA] should take control" and "resolve itself into a Provisional Government".

During the period 1922–1938, all seven signatories stood for re-election in the Irish Free State, but by 1938 none were successful. Therefore, they considered that their past electoral status in 1921-22 was more important than their subsequent attempts to be elected, as the Second Dáil arose from the last election held in the whole island of Ireland. The signatories now argued that the seven general elections that the Irish Free State electorate had voted in, from 1922 to mid-1938, had all been illegitimate and unconstitutional; even though they had themselves stood as candidates and had on occasion been elected in some of them.

The text of the statement is as follows:

DÁIL ÉIREANN

In consequence of armed opposition ordered and sustained by England, and the defection of elected representatives of the people over the period since the Republican Proclamation of Easter 1916 was ratified, three years later, by the newly inaugurated Government of the Irish Republic, we hereby delegate the authority reposed in us to the Army Council, in the spirit of the decision taken by Dáil Éireann in the spring of 1921, and later endorsed by the Second Dáil.

In thus transferring the trust of which it has been our privilege to be the custodians for twenty years, we earnestly exhort all citizens and friends of the Irish Republic at home and abroad to dissociate themselves openly and absolutely from England's unending aggressions: and we urge on them to disregard England's recurring war scares, remembering that our ancient and insular nation, bounded entirely by the seas, has infinitely less reason to become involved in the conflicts now so much threatened than have the neutral small nations lying between England and the Power she desires to overthrow.

Confident, in delegating this sacred trust to the Army of the Republic that, in their every action towards its consummation, they will be inspired by the high ideals and the chivalry of our martyred comrades, we, as Executive Council of Dáil Éireann, Government of the Republic, append our names.

Seán Ó Ceallaigh (Ceann Comhairle)
George Noble Plunkett
Professor William Stockley
Mary MacSwiney
Brian Ó hUiginn
Tom Maguire
Cathal Ó Murchadha

Dublin, December 8, 1938.

Henceforth, the IRA Army Council perceived itself to be the legitimate government of the Irish Republic. This allowed it to present its declaration of war on Britain in January 1939 (see S-Plan) as the act of a legitimate, de jure government.

== 1969: Official/Provisional split ==
In December 1969, the IRA General Army Convention decided to drop its policy of abstentionism. This resulted in a split in the organisation, leading to the emergence of the (then) majority Official IRA and (minority) Provisional IRA. The supporters of the latter approached Tom Maguire, the last surviving member of the 1938 seven-member rump Second Dáil, who declared that the Provisional IRA was the legitimate successor to the 1938 Army Council and, as such, was the legal embodiment of the Irish Republic.

The text of the statement is as follows:

An IRA convention, held in December 1969, by a majority of the delegates attending, passed a resolution removing all embargoes on political participation in parliament from the Constitution and Rules of the IRA.

The effect of the resolution is the abandonment of what is popularly termed the "Abstentionist Policy". The " Abstentionist Policy" means that the Republican candidates contesting parliamentary elections in Leinster House, Stormont or Westminster give pre-election pledges not to take seats in any of those parliaments. The Republican candidates seek election to the 32-county Parliament of the Irish Republic, the Republican Dáil or Dáil Éireann, to give it its official title. The declared objective is to elect sufficient representatives to enable the 32-County Dáil Éireann to be reassembled. In December 1938, the surviving faithful members of the latest 32-county Republican parliament, the Second Dáil, elected in 1921, delegated their executive powers of government to the Army Council of the IRA. This proclamation of 1938 was signed by Seán Ó Ceallaigh, Ceann Comhairle, George Count Plunkett, Professor William Stockley, Mary Mac Swiney, Brian Ó hUiginn, Cathal Ó Murchadha and myself Tomas Maguire.

The majority of the delegates at the December, 1969, IRA Convention, having passed the resolution referred to above, proceeded to elect an Executive which in turn appointed a new Army Council, committed to implement the resolution. That convention had neither the right nor the authority to pass such a resolution. Accordingly, I, as the sole surviving member of the Executive of Dáil Éireann, and the sole surviving signatory of the 1938 Proclamation, hereby declare that the resolution is illegal and that the alleged Executive and Army Council are illegal, and have no right to claim the allegiance of either soldiers or citizens of the Irish Republic.

The delegates who opposed the resolution, together with delegates from units which were not represented at the Convention, met subsequently in Convention and repudiated the resolution. They re-affirmed their allegiance to the Republic and elected a Provisional Executive which in turn appointed a Provisional Army Council.

I hereby further declare that the Provisional Executive and the Provisional Army Council are the lawful Executive and Army Council respectively of the IRA and that the governmental authority delegated in the Proclamation of 1938 now resides in the Provisional Army Council and its lawful successors. I fully endorse their call for support for Irish people everywhere towards the realisation of the full freedom of Ireland.

Dated: 31 December 1969
Signed: Thomas Maguire, Comdt. Gen. (Tomás Mac Uidhir)

The Provisional IRA's political wing, Sinn Féin, decided not to field candidates for the 1979 European Parliament election - the first 32-county election in Ireland since 1921. In the 1983 Sinn Féin ardfheis, it was decided to contest the 1984 European Parliament election on a non-abstentionist basis, that is, elected Sinn Féin candidates in the 1984 European election would serve as Members of the European Parliament, not as TDs of a new revolutionary Dáil.

== 1986 – Provisional/Continuity split ==
The Provisional Movement followed this analysis until 1986, when the IRA and Sinn Féin split over the issue of abstentionism once again. As in 1970, republican legitimists approached Tom Maguire, who in two statements written in 1986 and 1987 but issued posthumously in 1994, maintained that the Army Council of the Continuity IRA was the sole legitimate successor to the 1938 Army Council. (Note: Maguire died in 1993 aged 101.)

The texts of the statements are as follows:

There is no difference between entering the partition parliament of Leinster House and entering a partition parliament of Stormont. I speak as the sole surviving Teachta Dála of the Second Dáil Éireann (Note: Meaning the rump/faithful Second Dáil of 1938;) and as the sole surviving member of the Executive of the Second Dáil Éireann. In December, 1969, as the sole surviving member of the Executive of the Second Dáil Éireann, I recognised the Provisional Army Council, which remained true to the Irish Republic as the lawful Army of the Thirty-two County Irish Republic. I do not recognise the legitimacy of any Army Council styling itself the Army Council of the Irish Republican Army which lends support to any person or organisation styling itself as Sinn Féin and prepared to enter the partition parliament of Leinster House. The majority of delegates to a recent IRA convention purported to accept the Leinster House partition parliament, and in so doing broke faith and betrayed the trust placed in their predecessors in 1969. The Irish Republic, proclaimed in arms in Easter Week 1916 and established by the democratic majority vote of the people in the General Election of 1918, has been defended by Irish Republicans for several generations. Many have laid down their lives in that defence. Many others have suffered imprisonment and torture. I am confident the Cause so nobly served will yet triumph.
"If but a few are faithful found, they must be all the more steadfast for being but a few" (Terence Mac Swiney, Principles of Freedom).

Dated: 22 October 1986
Signed: Thomas Maguire Tomás Maguidhir Comdt. General

And:

I refer to my statement, dated 22 October 1986, and I speak again, as the sole surviving Teachta Dála of the Second Dáil Éireann, and the sole surviving member of the Executive of the Second Dáil. In that statement, I referred to my recognition in December, 1969, of the Provisional Army Council of the IRA, which had remained true to the Irish Republic, as the lawful Army of the Thirty Two County Irish Republic. I also stated on 22 October 1986, that I did not recognise the legitimacy of an Army Council, styling itself the Army Council of the Irish Republican Army, which lent support to any person or organisation styling itself Sinn Féin, and prepared to enter the partition parliament of Leinster House. I referred, as well, to the IRA Convention, which had taken place shortly before the 22n October, 1986. The Executive of the IRA had, by a majority, opposed entering Leinster House. The faithful members of that Executive, in accordance with the IRA Constitution, filled the vacancies in the Executive, and that Executive continues as the lawful Executive of the Irish Republican Army. The Continuity Executive has appointed an Army Council of the IRA. I quote the following extract from my statement of 31 December 1969:

"In December, 1938, the surviving faithful members of the latest 32 County Republican Parliament, the Second Dáil elected in 1921, delegated their executive powers of government to the Army Council of the IRA. This Proclamation of 1938 was signed by S.S. Ó Ceallaigh (Sceilg), Ceann Comhairle, Mary Mac Swiney, Count Plunkett, Cathal Ó Murchú, Brian O'Higgins, Professor Stockley, and myself, Tomás Maguire".

I hereby declare that the Continuity Executive and the Continuity Army Council are the lawful Executive and Army Council respectively of the Irish Republican Army, and that the governmental authority, delegated in the Proclamation of 1938, now resides in the Continuity Army Council, and its lawful successors.

Dated: 25 July 1987
Signed: Thomas Maguire Tomás Maguidhir Comdt. General

In the years after the split, the Provisionals moved towards a complete cessation of armed struggle, while Sinn Féin entered constitutional politics. The party now contests elections to the Dáil Éireann and the Northern Ireland Assembly - "partitionist parliaments" in the legitimist view - and takes up the seats it wins. However, Sinn Féin maintains an abstentionist stance towards the Westminster Parliament.

Republican Sinn Féin uphold the abstentionist tradition to both "partitionist parliaments" plus Westminster, and view themselves as the Sinn Féin organisation founded in 1905.

== See also ==
- "Dissident republican", label for those rejecting the 1990s peace process
