= Joseph Scott (police officer) =

Irish police officer (1901–1962)

Joseph Scott (4 March 1901 – 20 August 1962) was an Irish policeman with Garda Síochána and a recipient of the Scott Medal.

== Background ==
Scott was born at Leavhive, Creggs, County Galway, and was a farmer before joining the Garda Síochána on 1 April 1922, making him one of the first members of the force. His number was 679.

== Incident at Manorhamilton ==
While stationed at Manorhamilton, County Leitrim on 22 September 1935, he was one of a Gardaí rescue party in search of a girl who had fallen into a chasm in the Glencar Caves.

According to Gerald O'Brien:

"The actual depth of the chasm was unknown, though the Gardai were aware of local beliefs that it was considerable and that it might contain noxious gases. Aware that each wasted moment might mean the girl's life, Sergeant Scott immediately had himself lowered into the chasm .... some ninety feet before he reached the bottom ... he made the sad discovery of the girl's dead body in a pool of water. Remaining at the bottom in pitch darkness and crouched in almost three feet of water, he tied the rope to the body and had it brought to the surface. By the time this had been accomplished and the rope returned to him, some 2.5. hours had elapsed ... When he finally emerged again in the open air he was in urgent need of treatment for a catalogue of severe bruises, abraisions and cuts."

Scott was awarded the Scott Bronze Medal by Commissioner Eamonn Broy on 8 November 1937. He continued his career in the Sligo/Leitrim Division dying in harness on 20 August 1962 having served 40 years and 129 days.

== See also ==
- Yvonne Burke (Garda)
- Brian Connaughton
- Deaths of Henry Byrne and John Morley (1980)
- Death of Jerry McCabe (1996)
- Death of Adrian Donohoe (2013)
