= Scott Medal =

Bravery award for gardaí (Irish police)

The Walter Scott Medal for Valor is a medal awarded for acts of bravery by the Garda Síochána. It is not a state award, being in the gift of the Garda Commissioner.

== History ==
The Garda medal was instituted at the behest of Colonel Walter Scott, a New York City philanthropist who took an interest in policing. In 1923, he gave to the Garda a one thousand dollar gold bond, which would pay in perpetuity for a gold medal.

The award was to be presented under the following condition:

"No action, however heroic, will merit the award of the Scott medal unless it takes the shape of an act of personal bravery, performed intelligently in the execution of duty at imminent risk to the life of the doer, and armed with full previous knowledge of the risk involved."

In 1942, the award condition was amended to "most exceptional bravery and heroism involving the risk of life in the execution of duty".

== Design ==
The medal itself was designed by John F. Maxwell, a Dublin-based teacher who also designed the Garda Síochána crest. The medal is a Celtic cross which is 44 millimetres (1.7 in) in diameter with five panels on the face. The inscription on the top panel is "The Scott Medal" and on the lower panel "For Valor" (note the American English usage of the word "valour"). On the right and left are the eagle and shield of the United States and the harp and sunburst of Ireland, respectively. The centerpiece is the Garda crest with the intertwined letters "G.S." for Garda Síochána.

The reverse is inscribed "Garda Síochána na h-Éireann". The four outside panels are the arms of the four provinces of Ireland: Ulster, Munster, Leinster and Connaught.

== Recipients ==
Recipients of the Scott Medal have included:

- Brian Connaughton (1930)
- Henry L. Smith (1932)
- Patrick Quinn (1934)
- Manus Patten (1938)
- Richard Fallon (1971)
- John Martin Cafferky (1972)
- John M. G. Cosgrove (1974)
- Henry Byrne and John Morley (1980)
- Yvonne Burke (1998; first female recipient)
- Patrick J. Molloy (1998)
- Jerry McCabe (2000; awarded posthumously after he was shot and killed during a Provisional Irish Republican Army robbery in 1996)

== Noel McMahon controversy ==
At a ceremony in the grounds of Dublin Castle on 24 September 2021, fifteen Gardaí were awarded Scott Medals for participating in the 1983 operation to rescue Don Tidey, who had been kidnapped by the Provisional Irish Republican Army. Present at the ceremony was Heather Humphreys in her capacity as acting Minister for Justice during Helen McEntee's maternity leave. The gold medal was awarded (posthumously) to one Garda, Gary Sheehan, who had been shot dead in the crossfire. Among the eight who received the silver medal was retired Detective Garda Noel McMahon, despite his having resigned from the force in 2004 after the Morris Tribunal found that in the 1990s he had engaged in domestic abuse and planting evidence. McMahon's award was raised by website The Ditch during the 2025 Irish presidential election in which Humphreys was a candidate. There were calls to rescind McMahon's award.

== See also ==
- List of Irish police officers killed in the line of duty
