= Killing of Jerry McCabe =

Murder of a garda by the Provisional IRA in 1996

Detective Garda Jerry McCabe (22 November 1943 – 7 June 1996) was a member of the Garda Síochána, the national police force of Ireland. McCabe was killed in Adare, County Limerick on 7 June 1996, by members of the Provisional IRA, during the attempted robbery of a post office van.

== Early life ==
Detective Garda McCabe, from Ballylongford in County Kerry, was born on 22 November 1943. He was married to Anne, a daughter of a Garda. The couple lived in Limerick and had five children, John, Mark, Ian, Stacy, and Desmond, known as Ross. John and Ross are serving members of the Garda Síochána.

== The robbery ==
The two detectives were escorting an An Post van carrying IR£81,000 at 6:50 am on 7 June 1996 in Adare, Co. Limerick, Ireland, when Detective Garda Ben O'Sullivan noticed a Pajero heading towards them from behind. The car collided with them. Two men wearing balaclavas jumped out of the Pajero and fired 15 rounds from an AK-47 at the detectives. Three rounds hit Jerry McCabe, killing him. His colleague, O'Sullivan, was seriously injured, having been hit 11 times. One bullet strayed and lodged in the Garda patrol car, a Ford Mondeo. They were fired on full automatic by the gunman. Detective O'Sullivan, who was driving the car, has said that he is convinced it was a deliberate, controlled shooting.

Shortly after the shooting, a Mitsubishi Lancer arrived and the would-be robbers made their getaway in it. No money had been stolen by them, but both vehicles used at the crime scene had been stolen.

The Gardaí had been armed with .38 Smith & Wesson revolvers and an Uzi, but the trial heard that they had not had time to use them.

Bullet casings found at the scene were unique to the IRA in Ireland at the time.

== Aftermath ==
Up to 50,000 people lined the streets of Limerick for McCabe's funeral.

The killing of Detective McCabe happened four months after the breakdown of the first IRA ceasefire in 1996. The IRA Army Council initially denied involvement, but later claimed that individual members were involved "in contravention of its orders". Sinn Féin leader Gerry Adams would later state that the operation was "not authorised by the Army Council, but authorised at a lower level by an authorised person". The killing was denounced by the leadership of Sinn Féin, but later the party lobbied for the early release of McCabe's killers under the terms of the Good Friday Agreement. In 2005, the prisoners stated that they did not want their release "to be part of any further negotiations with the Irish government."

Pearse McAuley from Strabane and three County Limerick men – Jeremiah Sheehy, Michael O'Neill and Kevin Walsh – were convicted by the non-jury Special Criminal Court of manslaughter. McAuley had escaped from Brixton Prison in 1991 while awaiting prosecution over the IRA's campaign in England and had jumped bail in Ireland two months before the shooting. O'Neill was released from prison on 15 May 2007 with Sheehy released on 4 February 2008. Walsh and McAuley were released on 5 August 2009 after completing their full sentence. Sinn Féin had campaigned for their release under the Good Friday Agreement despite the Irish government's insistence that these prisoners were excluded during the negotiations for the Agreement. The Alliance Party of Northern Ireland accused the Irish government of "double standards" by not granting those responsible for the killing early release like paramilitary prisoners in Northern Ireland.

McCabe's widow Anne has been praised for the way she conducted herself since the shooting. In New York in 2006, she challenged Gerry Adams as to why his organisation was calling for the release of the men convicted of the killing. In 2000, she accepted the Gold Scott Medal on her husband's behalf. The Scott Medal is the highest honour bestowed by Ireland on a Garda who has shown exceptional courage and heroism risking their lives in their work as police officers.

== Detective Garda Jerry McCabe Fellowship ==
An academic exchange programme in honour of the slain detective was established in 1996 at the John Jay College of Criminal Justice in New York City. The purpose of the exchange is to promote the sharing of practices and technologies in policing and criminal justice between Ireland and the United States. Jerry McCabe's son John was the first recipient of the fellowship in 1997.

== See also ==
- List of Irish police officers killed in the line of duty
- Garda ar Lár
- Yvonne Burke (Garda)
- Michael Noel Canavan
- Death of Michael J. Reynolds
- Deaths of Henry Byrne and John Morley (1980)
- Death of Adrian Donohoe (2013)
