= Yvonne Burke (Garda) =

Irish police officer

Yvonne Burke (born 20 April 1970) was a Garda Síochána and the first female recipient of the Scott Medal.

== Incident at Cabra ==
Burke and her colleague, Garda Brady, were on mobile patrol on the Navan Road, Cabra, on 13 November 1993 when an alarm was raised at a local supermarket. At the scene they observed two men depart suspiciously on a motorbike, who very soon fell off. Approaching in the patrol car, they received gunfire from one of the men, using a sawn-off shotgun, which shattered the passenger-side windscreen. Both men re-mounted the bike and a high-speed chase resumed towards Blanchardstown.

Once again, control of the motorbike was lost and the two men fell to the road, very heavily. Burke and Brady were able to seize the shotgun from the dazed pillion passenger. At the same time, the rider recovered enough to re-mount and attempt another escape, but collided with a vehicle. He ran into a field where he was arrested.

Burke and Brady were presented with their Scott Silver Medals by Justice Minister John O'Donoghue at Garda Síochána College, Templemore, on 23 July 1998. As of 2008 both Gardaí were on the force.

== See also ==
- Brian Connaughton
- Joseph Scott
- Deaths of Henry Byrne and John Morley (1980)
- Death of Jerry McCabe (1996)
- Death of Adrian Donohoe (2013)
