= Brian Connaughton (Scott Medal recipient) =

Irish police officer (1899–1983)

Brian Connaughton (8 October 1899 – 26 March 1983), Garda Síochána and recipient of the Scott Medal.

== Background ==
Connaughton was a native of Ballinglas, Mountbellew, County Galway. Prior to joining the Gardaí he had been a farmer, enlisting as Garda 4447.

== Incident at Drumshambo ==
He and Sergeant Michael Mullane were serving at Drumshambo, County Leitrim in 1930 when "with great perseverance, they tracked down two armed men, members of an illegal organization", arresting the men and seizing three rifles.

Mullane and Connaughton were respectively awarded the gold and silver Scott Medal from James Fitzgerald-Kenney, Minister of Justice, on 28 July 1931. They were the 18th and 19th members of the force to receive the award since its inception in 1923.

== Later life ==
Connaughton retired with the rank of Sergeant, retiring on 14 March 1965. He died in 1983.

== See also ==
- Category:Recipients of the Scott Medal
