= Murder of Henry Byrne and John Morley =

1980 murder of two police officers in Ireland

Henry Byrne and John Morley, two officers of the Garda Síochána, the police force of the Republic of Ireland, were murdered on 7 July 1980 by alleged members of the Irish National Liberation Army (INLA). The officers' deaths provoked national outrage. Three men were apprehended, convicted, and sentenced to death for capital murder. Two of the sentences were later reduced to 40 years' imprisonment while the third was overturned.

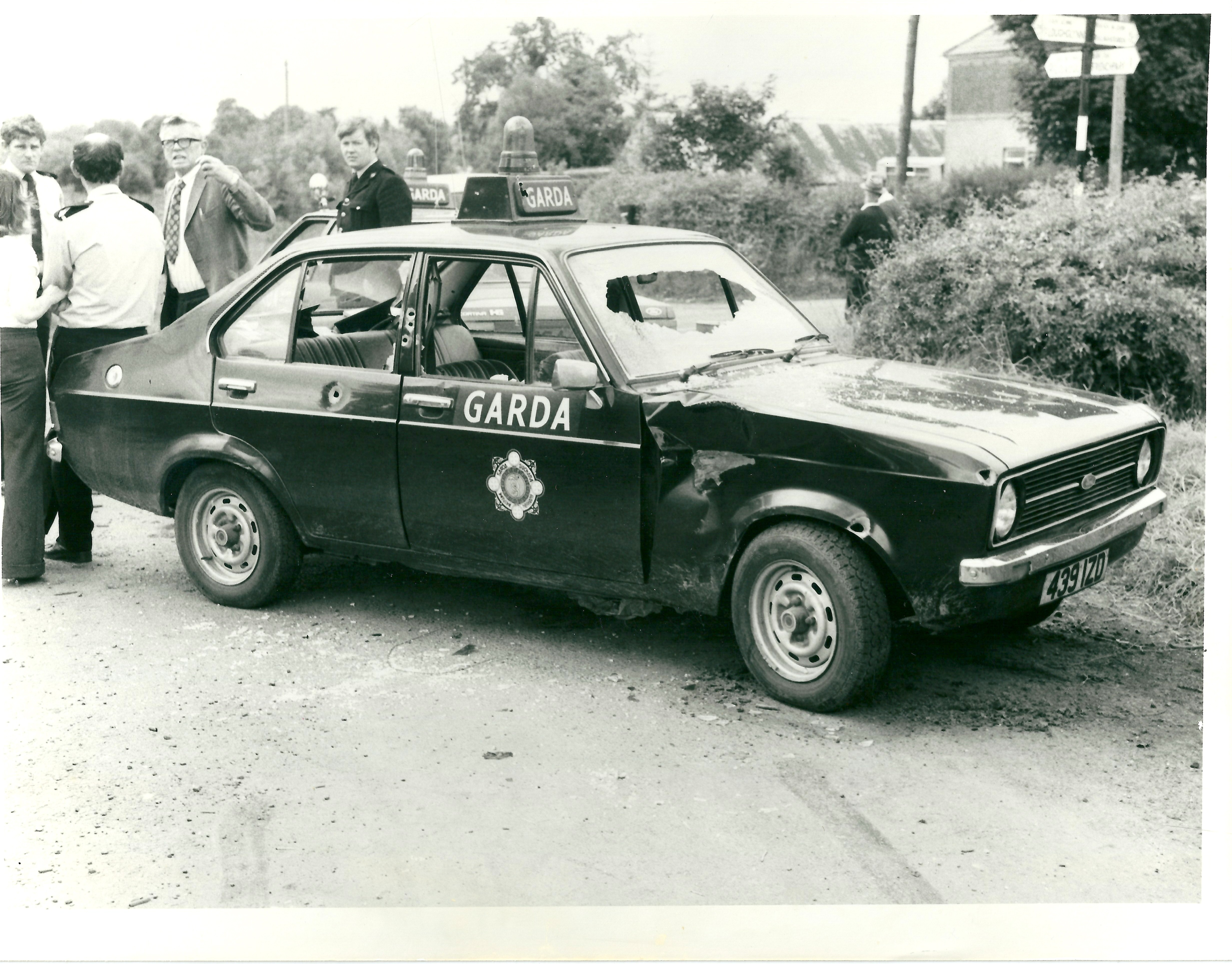
The Garda patrol car after the shootout

== Bank robbery ==
On 7 July 1980, three armed and masked men raided the Bank of Ireland in Ballaghaderreen, County Roscommon. The group held staff and customers at gunpoint before leaving with IR£35,000. The Gardaí (Irish police) arrived on the scene but were unarmed and were unable to stop the armed men from escaping in a blue Ford Cortina. The perpetrators were intercepted by a Garda patrol car from Castlerea station with four Gardaí, including Detective John Morley, who was armed with an Uzi submachine gun. The two cars collided at Shannon's Cross, Aghaderry, Loughglinn. One of the raiders jumped out of the Cortina and sprayed the patrol car with bullets, killing Garda Henry Byrne.

One man left the Cortina and ran off while his two accomplices – wearing balaclavas – ran in the opposite direction. There was an exchange of shots in which Morley is believed to have wounded one of the men, but he himself was fatally wounded. Both of these men were later apprehended, while a third man - Peter Pringle - was arrested in the city of Galway almost a fortnight later. The two other Gardaí - Sergeant Mick O'Malley and Garda Derek O'Kelly - survived the shootout.

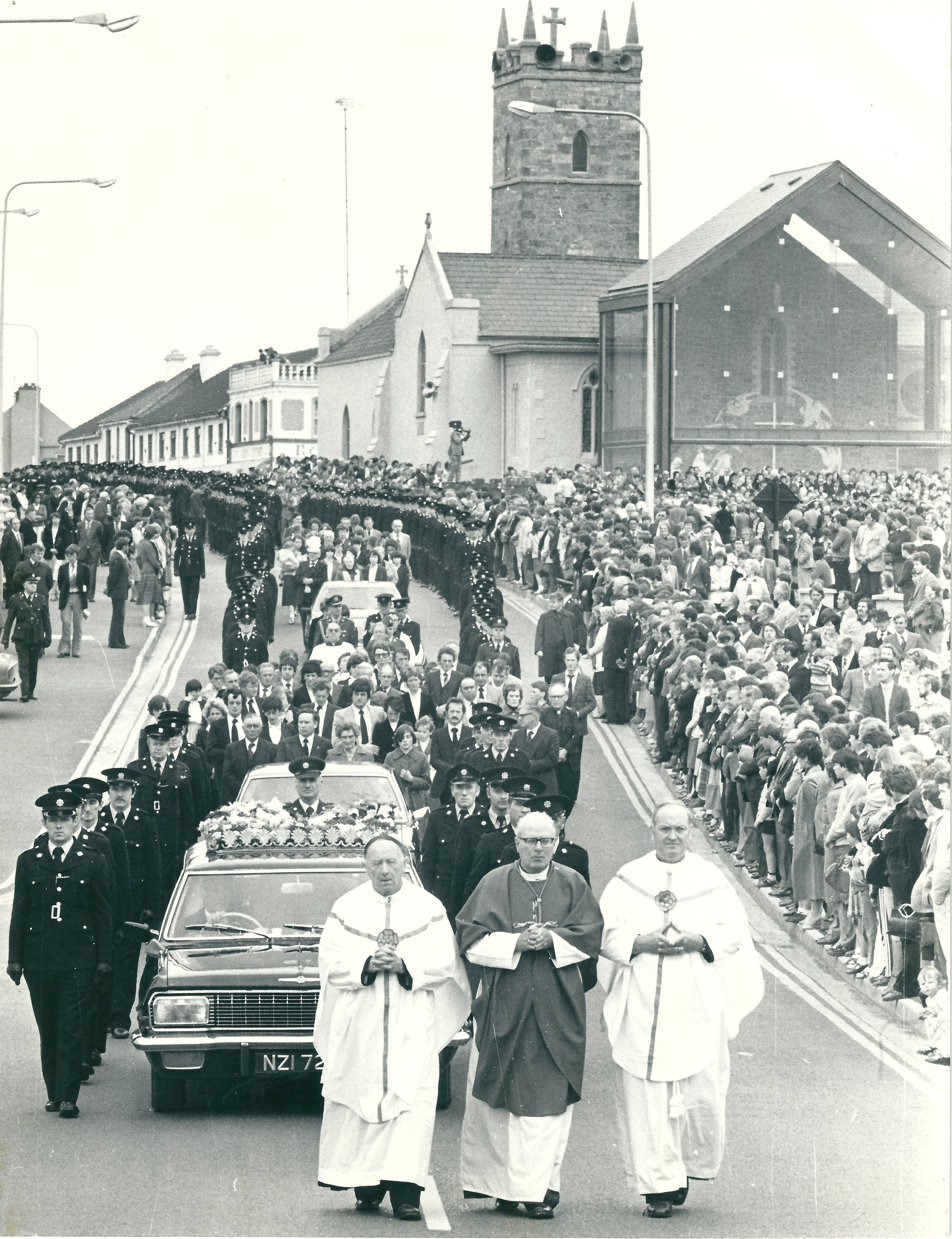
Funeral procession of John Morley and Henry Byrne, Knock, 1980

== Garda Síochána officers ==
John Francis Morley, born in 1942 in Knock, County Mayo, was a Garda Síochána detective. Morley was married with two sons, Shane and Gordon, and a daughter, Gillian. Morley had also been a noted Gaelic footballer and was considered one of the best centre-backs in the history of Connacht football. He played 112 league and championship games for Mayo between 1961–1974.

Henry Gerard Byrne, born in 1951 in Knock, County Mayo, was an officer in the Gardaí. Byrne was married with two children and his wife was pregnant with a third at the time of his death.

== Aftermath ==
The event drew considerable national media commentary in Ireland. Byrne and Morley were the fifth and sixth gardaí to die in the Troubles, and the 21st and 22nd gardaí to die violently since the foundation of the state in 1922.

Morley and Byrne were posthumously awarded the Scott Medal for their actions. The medals were presented to their families at a special ceremony in Templemore in 1982.

The three men apprehended were Peter Pringle, Patrick McCann, and Colm O'Shea. Because a portion of funding for the Irish National Liberation Army (INLA), a Republican paramilitary organisation, came from bank robberies, the three robbery suspects were identified as being associated with the INLA. This claim was disputed by advocates for the Irish Republican Socialist Party (IRSP), the INLA's political wing, who stated that only one of the men (Pringle) had had a peripheral connection with the Irish Republican organisation some years earlier.

All three men were found guilty of murder and sentenced to death by hanging. A fortnight before their execution dates in June 1981, their sentences were commuted to 40 years' imprisonment with no chance of parole. Pringle always denied any involvement in the crime and his conviction was overturned by the High Court in 1995 due to discrepancies in the evidence. In September 2012, Colm O'Shea was one of Ireland's longest-serving prisoners, but he failed in an appeal to the High Court for the remission of his sentence which determined O'Shea was not entitled to the standard 30-year remission. However, in July 2013, the Irish Supreme Court ruled that a prisoner serving 40 years for capital murder was entitled to the normal remission on his sentence if he met the conditions applied to other inmates. As a result, the prison authorities found that both O'Shea and McCann had already served the required 30-year term in jail and they were consequently released from Portlaoise Prison. The details of their releases were not published in the national press until October 2013.

The events of the crime are recalled in a 2012 episode of the RTÉ One programme Garda ar Lár.

== See also ==
- List of Irish police officers killed in the line of duty
- Timeline of Irish National Liberation Army actions
- Capital punishment in Ireland

== Sources ==
- Lost Lives:The stories of the men, women and children who died as a result of the Northern Ireland troubles, David McKittrick, Seamus Kelters, Brian Feeney and Christ Thornton, pp. 831–832. ISBN 9 781840 182279.
