= Patrick Joseph Morrissey =

Irish police officer (1936–1985)

- Born: 7 March 1936; Belturbet, County Cavan, Ireland
- Died: 27 June 1985 (aged 49); Tallanstown, County Louth, Ireland
- Spouse: Bernadette (1964–1985; his death)
- Children: 4
- Police career
- Department: Garda Síochána
- Service years: 1960–1985 (24 years)
- Rank: Sergeant
- Badge no.: 14545K

Sergeant Patrick Joseph Morrissey (7 March 1936 – 27 June 1985) was a member of the Garda Síochána, the national police service of Ireland, killed by the INLA. His murder resulted in the last death sentences issued by an Irish court, 30 years after the last death sentence executed in Ireland.

== Personal life ==
He was a native of Belturbet, County Cavan. He served in the Irish Army from 1953 to 1960. He lived in Drogheda with his wife Bernadette and their four children: Martin, Brian, Mary and Aideen.

== Career ==
Morrissey joined the Garda Síochána on 14 December 1960 and was promoted to sergeant on 24th October 1974. He was stationed at Collon, County Louth, for a number of years before his death. He also served at Tramore, Drogheda, Dundrum, Stepaside, Fitzgibbon Street, Whitehall, the Bridewell and at Garda Headquarters. An experienced diver and lifeguard, he played a major role in the development of the Garda Sub-Aqua Unit.

== Robbery and shooting ==
He was shot dead while in pursuit of two INLA members - Michael McHugh from Crossmaglen and Noel Callan from Cullaville County Armagh - who had robbed the Labour Exchange in Ardee and stolen £25,000 in cash. Sgt. Morrissey was at Ardee courthouse for a sitting of the local court when he found out about the raid at the employment exchange in Ardee. He joined two Ardee-based Gardaí in their patrol car who were shot at by the robbers. Near Tallanstown the robbers, who had switched from a car to a motorcycle, collided with an approaching car injuring its occupants. Two of the Gardaí stayed with the injured persons while Sergeant Morrissey, alone and on foot, pursued the raiders. As he caught up with them, a shot was fired and he fell to the ground grievously wounded. One of the gunmen stood over him and at point-blank range shot the Sergeant dead. RTÉ Security Correspondent at the time, Tom McCaughren, described it as "an execution".

== Awards ==
Sergeant Morrissey was posthumously awarded the Scott Gold Medal on 4 December 1986. He was awarded the posthumous Freedom of Drogheda in 2013.

== See also ==
- List of Irish police officers killed in the line of duty
- Garda ar Lár
- Seamus Quaid
- Michael Clerkin
- Frank Hand
- Samuel Donegan
- Gary Sheehan
