= Garda ar Lár =

- Genre: Documentary
- Starring: Various Gardaí
- Country of origin: Ireland
- Original languages: English, Irish
- No. of series: 2
- No. of episodes: At least 5

Production
- Running time: 30 minutes

Original release
- Network: RTÉ One

Garda ar Lár (Irish pronunciation: [ˈɡaːɾˠd̪ˠə ɛɾʲ ˈl̪ˠaːɾˠ]; English: Garda Down) is an Irish television series, the second season of which was broadcast on RTÉ One in January and February 2009. It examined incidents where members of the Garda Síochána (the police force of the Republic of Ireland) were killed in action since the foundation of the state. Over thirty members of the force had died during this period. The series was broadcast on Mondays at 19:30.

== Episode list ==
=== Series two ===
==== Programme one ====
The first programme of the second season examined the case of Sergeant Patrick Morrissey and was broadcast on 19 January 2009. The sergeant was pursuing two men following the Ardee Employment Exchange robbery in 1985.

==== Programme two ====
The second programme of the second season examined the case of Garda Seamus Quaid and was broadcast on 26 January 2009. In January 1972, seven men, including Peter Rogers, escaped from the prison ship Maidstone, moored in Belfast Lough, by darkening their bodies, sawing through a ship port hole and swimming to shore. 'The Magnificent Seven', as they were later referred to, appeared at a press conference in Dublin the following morning. Rogers later moved to Wexford, marrying but still participating in republican activities. On 13 October 1980, Rogers was moving a large amount of arms and explosives via his vegetable van. Earlier that day, a bank robbery had taken place in Callan, County Kilkenny; Seamus Quaid and a colleague, Donal Lyttleton, were sent to monitor Rogers's movements. Unable to locate him, they set off back for Wexford that night, only to pass his van on a lonely Wexford road. Both men were familiar with Rogers and Lyttleton left his gun in the police car. But, whilst searching the van, Rogers pulled his gun on the pair. Lyttleton managed to escape, whereas Rogers was injured and made his way to a neighbour's house, the Kellys'. Seamus Quaid was left lying badly injured on the ground; he was dead within fifteen minutes. The death caused major division in the Wexford community.

==== Programme three ====
The third programme of the second season examined the case of Garda Patrick Gerard Reynolds and was broadcast on 2 February 2009. The case of Reynolds's murder lasted for eighteen years. On 19 February 1982, he was on night duty. At 01:30, an anonymous phonecall came through to the station, stating that suspicious activity was taking place in a block of flats in Tallaght. Five Gardaí left to investigate and, upon their arrival at 33 Avonbeg Gardens, two of them forced their way inside, where they found a number of armed men counting the proceeds of a bank robbery. Following a struggle, two of the gunmen fled the flat, faced with an unarmed 23-year-old Reynolds, who retreated back down the stairs. However, he was shot in the back and bled to death as his killer escaped.

==== Programme four ====
The fourth programme of the second season examined the case of Garda Michael Clerkin and was broadcast on 9 February 2009. On the night of 16 October 1976, Gardaí were deliberately lured to an isolated abandoned farmhouse in County Laois. The house had been booby trapped with explosives, and 24-year-old Garda Michael Clerkin, from Monaghan and only four years in the force, was killed. Detective Tom Peters was also seriously injured and left both deaf and blind, whilst colleagues Jim Cannon, Ben Thornton and Gerry Bohan survived the attack unscathed. It occurred just after President Cearbhall Ó Dálaigh signed the Emergency Powers Bill into law, which during turbulent times aimed to increase the period of detention without charge from two to seven days. Gardaí in Portlaoise received an anonymous phone call stating that subversive activity was ongoing at a disused house at Garryhinch, with a plot to kill local Fine Gael TD Oliver J. Flanagan. Portlaoise phoned the local Portarlington Station, just three miles from Garryhinch and Sergeant Jim Cannon was advised to go to the disused house. Cannon brought two uniformed Gardaí with him, Gerry Bohan and Michael Clerkin, and the two joined forces with Detectives Tom Peters and Ben Thornton on the way. Clerkin used an open rear window to enter the house, opening the front door from the inside to let the others in, triggering the booby trap and killing himself instantaneously. The house had to be demolished in the aftermath. The next day, the Minister for Defence Paddy Donegan, made what became known as his infamous "thundering disgrace" remarks, aimed at Ó Dálaigh for his actions regarding the Emergency Powers Bill. The president subsequently resigned.

==== Programme five ====
The fifth programme of the second season examined the case of Garda Recruit Gary Sheehan and was broadcast on 16 February 2009. On 24 November 1983, Englishman Don Tidey was delivering his 13-year-old daughter to school when on the road outside his home in south Dublin he was stopped at what appeared to be a Garda checkpoint, but was in fact a Provisional IRA trap. However, the bogus gardaí produced guns and kidnapped the Quinnsworth supermarket executive, holding him for three weeks. A manhunt ensued and Don Tidey became a household name. Intelligence led to the search returning to North Leitrim and, weeks before Christmas, a co-ordinated search code-named Operation Santa Claus was mounted in Ballinamore. The operation was treated so highly that the army as well as hundreds of Gardaí and even Garda Recruits, still in training, became involved. On 16 December, Inspector Séamus O'Hanlon's group recommenced their search following lunch in Drumcromin wood, near Derrada a few miles north of Ballinamore. They stumbled upon the kidnappers' hideout in a thicket with low visibility – what followed was a confusing and chaotic. The kidnappers fired on the searchers and escaped, with several Gardaí and army personnel being taken hostage along the way. Don Tidey managed to free himself from the kidnappers in the chaos and was found by the Garda.

== See also ==
- List of Irish police officers killed in the line of duty
- Deaths of Henry Byrne and John Morley (1980)
- Death of Jerry McCabe (1996)
- Death of Adrian Donohoe (2013)
