= Murder of Colm Horkan =

Shooting in Castlerea, County Roscommon, Ireland on 17 June 2020

Shooting of Colm Horkan
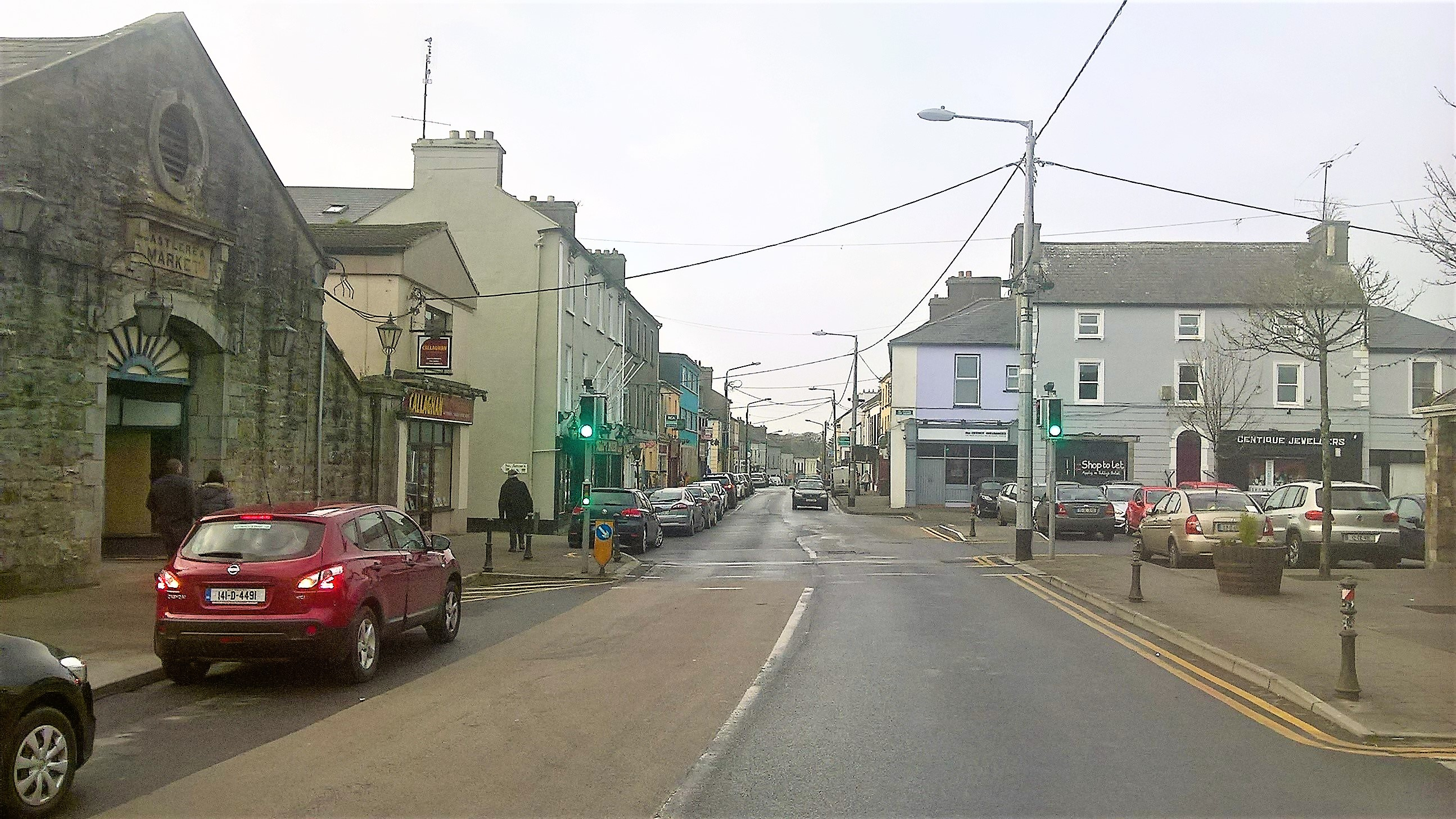
- Main Street, Castlerea, County Roscommon, where the attack occurred
- Location: Main Street, Castlerea, County Roscommon, Ireland
- Date: 17 June 2020; 11:45 pm (GMT)
- Attack type: Shooting
- Weapon: SIG Sauer P226

Detective Garda Colm Horkan was a detective in the Garda Síochána, the national police service of Ireland, who was shot dead by a 43-year-old man in Castlerea, County Roscommon, Ireland on 17 June 2020, while on an anti-crime patrol.

== Personal life ==
Colm Horkan was born on 13 December 1970 in Charlestown, County Mayo to parents Dolores and Marty. He grew up with his four brothers—Aidan, Brendan, Dermot and Pádraic, and two sisters—Deirdre and Collette. Horkan was a former Charlestown Sarsfields GAA footballer and joined the Garda Síochána in 1994. He attended the Garda Síochána College in Templemore, County Tipperary, the same time as Adrian Donohoe who was later shot dead in 2013 in a Credit Union robbery in County Louth, becoming the 87th garda to be killed in the line of duty.

== Incident ==
According to contemporary media reports, on Wednesday, 17 June 2020 at 11:45 pm, Horkan was on an anti-crime patrol by himself in Castlerea, County Roscommon and stopped a man after receiving a report of someone speeding and driving recklessly on a motorcycle in the town's Main Street. Horkan stopped a male on a motorcycle matching the description provided to Gardaí by the public, and as he was speaking to him, the perpetrator reached for Horkan's issued firearm, and after a short struggle the man managed to get hold of Horkan's official SIG Sauer handgun and fired fifteen rounds, hitting him six times in the chest and neck. The other nine rounds went through a bank and shop window in the town centre. At around midnight, Gardaí rushed to the scene after hearing the gunshots from Castlerea Garda Station—just five minutes away from the scene. The Armed Support Unit arrived at the scene after Horkan pressed his panic button on his radio for emergency backup prior to the shooting. He was later pronounced dead by paramedics at the scene, becoming the 89th garda to be killed in the line of duty. The suspect made no attempt to flee the scene and was arrested minutes later.

== Aftermath ==
The day after the incident on 18 June 2020, the Taoiseach Leo Varadkar and President Michael D. Higgins paid tribute to Horkan. Hundreds of people attended a vigil for Horkan in Castlerea, County Roscommon to pay their respects. A small marquee was set up on the street where the incident occurred and tributes were led by local Fianna Fáil councillor Paschal Fitzmaurice. On 20 June 2020, the President Michael D. Higgins led a memorial service on the grounds of Áras an Uachtaráin. On 21 June 2020, a state funeral was held in St James's Church in his hometown of Charlestown, County Mayo. Due to the COVID-19 pandemic in the Republic of Ireland, social distancing protocols meant the numbers in the church were limited to Horkan's immediate family along with Garda Commissioner Drew Harris and the Minister for Justice and Equality Charles Flanagan. Dáil Éireann and garda stations around Ireland marked a minute's silence to remember Horkan. The Taoiseach Leo Varadkar marked the minute silence at Garda Headquarters in the Phoenix Park. At Áras an Uachtaráin, the president attended a ringing of the Peace Bell and raised the Irish flag at half-mast as a mark of respect to Horkan.

On 5 September, Minister for Justice Helen McEntee honoured and reflected on the loss of Horkan as she marked National Services Day 2020.

== Perpetrator ==
Stephen Silver, a 43-year-old man living in Foxford, County Mayo, but originally from County Roscommon, was reportedly arrested at the scene by Garda Helen Gillen and was brought to Castlerea Garda Station. He appeared at Harristown District Court and was charged with the murder of Horkan on 19 June 2020. Silver was first remanded in custody to Castlerea Prison on 19 June and was then transferred to the Midlands Prison.

=== Court ===
Silver was repeatedly deemed unfit to attend court at Harristown District Court in Roscommon via video link due to mental health issues. He was detained at the Central Mental Hospital in Dublin, where he was receiving psychiatric treatment.

In August 2020, it was reported that the extent of the investigation involved 200 statements, 250 exhibits and 70 segments of CCTV footage, while gardaí made inquiries with a witness in Australia.

On 6 November 2020, five months after the shooting, further charges were considered against Silver as he was deemed medically unfit to attend court for the eleventh time and remained at the Central Mental Hospital.

Silver appeared at Castlerea District Court on 27 November where he was charged with the capital murder of Detective Garda Colm Horkan, and was remanded in custody to the Midlands Prison in Portlaoise to appear via video link before Harristown District Court on 4 December.

=== Trial ===
On 19 February 2021, Silver was sent forward for trial to the Central Criminal Court charged with the murder of Horkan. The next month, it was announced that he would go on trial at the Central Criminal Court on 15 June 2022. In April 2022, it was announced that the trial was delayed until October.

Silver went on trial on 7 October 2022 and pleaded not guilty to the murder of Horkan acting in the course of his duty, but guilty to manslaughter on the basis of diminished responsibility. Silver told the Central Criminal Court that he shot Horkan because of "all that was going on with the police in the world", claiming he had been attacked by Horkan at first and was also heard to mention "black lives matter" in the immediate aftermath of the shooting.

The court heard Silver had been diagnosed with bipolar disorder and had a history of mental illness and hospital admissions going back nearly 20 years. The defence argued that he was suffering from a relapse of his mental disorder at the time of the shooting. The prosecution case was that Silver was filled with anger towards Gardaí and there was no evidence that his mental disorder had caused him to act in the way he did.

On 17 November 2022, the jury at the Central Criminal Court failed to reach a verdict in the trial of Silver.

On 15 March 2023, Silver was found guilty of the capital murder of Detective Garda Horkan after two trials at the Central Criminal Court. He was sentenced to life in prison on 19 April 2023.

== See also ==
- List of Gardaí killed in the line of duty
- Murder of Adrian Donohoe
