= Seamus Quaid =

Irish police officer and hurler

Séamus Quaid
Personal information
- Native name: Séamus Mac Uaid (Irish)
- Born: 16 November 1937 Feohanagh, County Limerick, Ireland
- Died: 13 October 1980 (aged 42) Ballyconnick, County Wexford, Ireland
- Occupation: Garda
- Height: 6 ft 0 in (183 cm)

Sport
- Sport: Hurling
- Position: Left wing-forward
Clubs
- Years: Club
- Feohanagh; Faythe Harriers
Club titles
- Wexford titles: 3
Inter-county*
Years	County	Apps (scores)
1958-1961	Wexford	5 (1-3)
Inter-county titles
- Leinster titles: 1
- All-Irelands: 1
- NHL: 0
- *Inter County team apps and scores correct as of 14:46, 17 March 2015.

Seamus Quaid (16 November 1937 – 13 October 1980) was an Irish police officer of the Garda Síochána (Garda 13497), killed in the line of duty by the IRA. He was a native of County Limerick, and became a member of the Wexford hurling team in October 1958. In 1960, Quaid was a part of the County Wexford team that won the All-Ireland Senior Hurling Championship.

In January 1972, IRA member Peter Rogers escaped from HMS Maidstone, a prison ship moored in Belfast, Northern Ireland. Fleeing south across the border into the Republic of Ireland, Rogers settled and married in County Wexford. Remaining an active IRA member, an incident occurred on 13 October 1980, where Rogers fired upon two policemen, Garda Quaid and Garda Lyttleton, while they were attempting to detain him. Lyttleton managed to escape but Quaid was wounded and died within fifteen minutes.

Rogers was sentenced to death, later commuted to forty years imprisonment, but was eventually released under the terms of the Good Friday Agreement. Rogers claimed in 2014, that the 1980 incident which resulted in Garda Quaid's death had occurred shortly after attending a meeting in Dublin with Gerry Adams and Martin McGuinness, to which Rogers was summoned because of his reluctance to move explosives to England for a bombing campaign.

In 2014, Sinn Féin held their Ard Fheis (annual party conference) at the Wexford Opera House, which contained a plaque in memory of Garda Quaid. The Quaid family criticised Sinn Féin's decision to hold its conference in the opera house, believing the decision was a slap in the face of the family. The family then removed the plaque from the opera house before the conference, and declined to respond to apologies offered by McGuinness, or offers to meet him.

== See also ==
- List of Irish police officers killed in the line of duty
- Garda ar Lár
- Richard Fallon (police officer)
- Samuel Donegan
- Deaths of Henry Byrne and John Morley
- Death of Jerry McCabe
