= List of Gardaí killed in the line of duty =

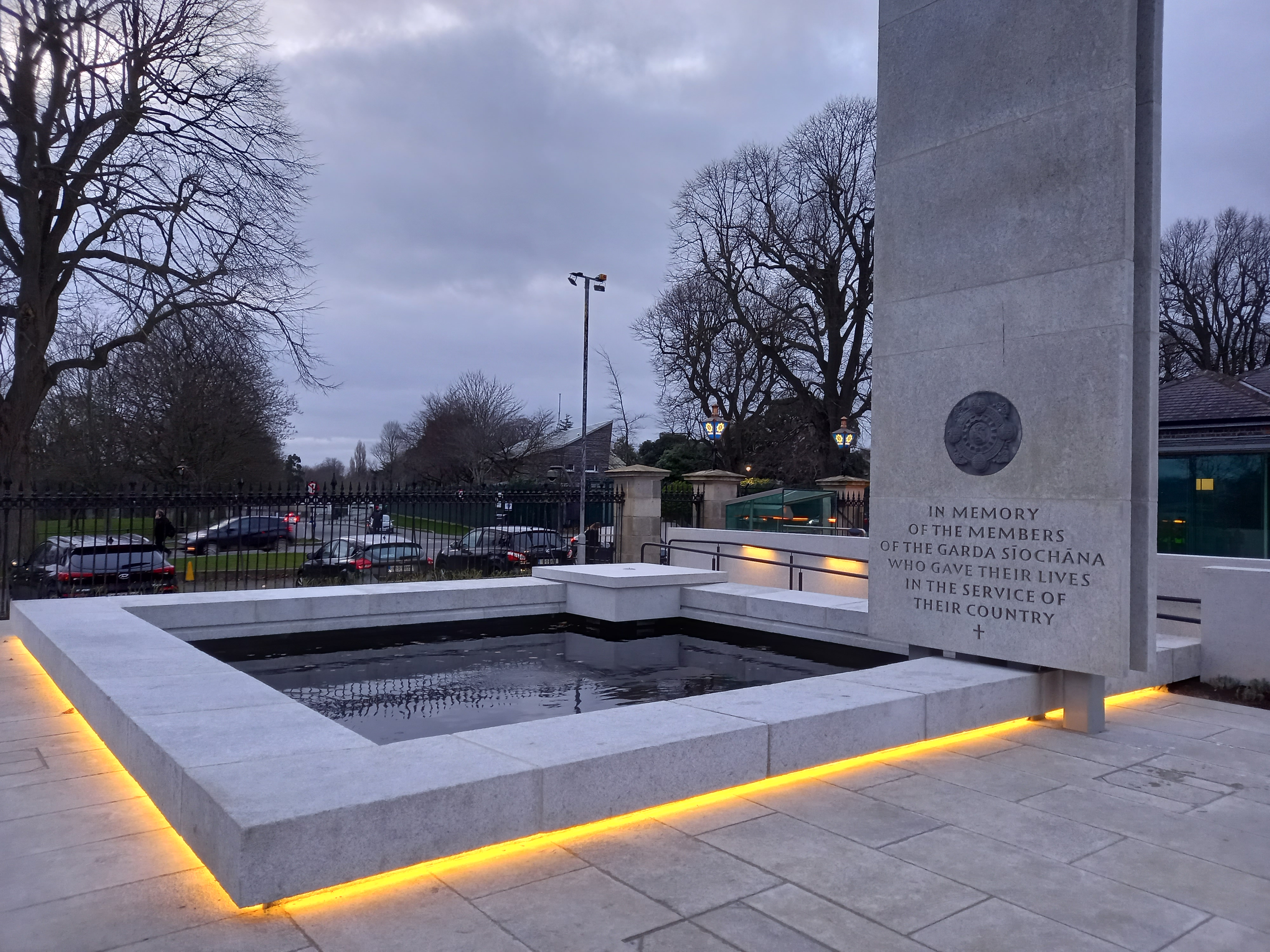
Memorial in Garda Headquarters, Phoenix Park

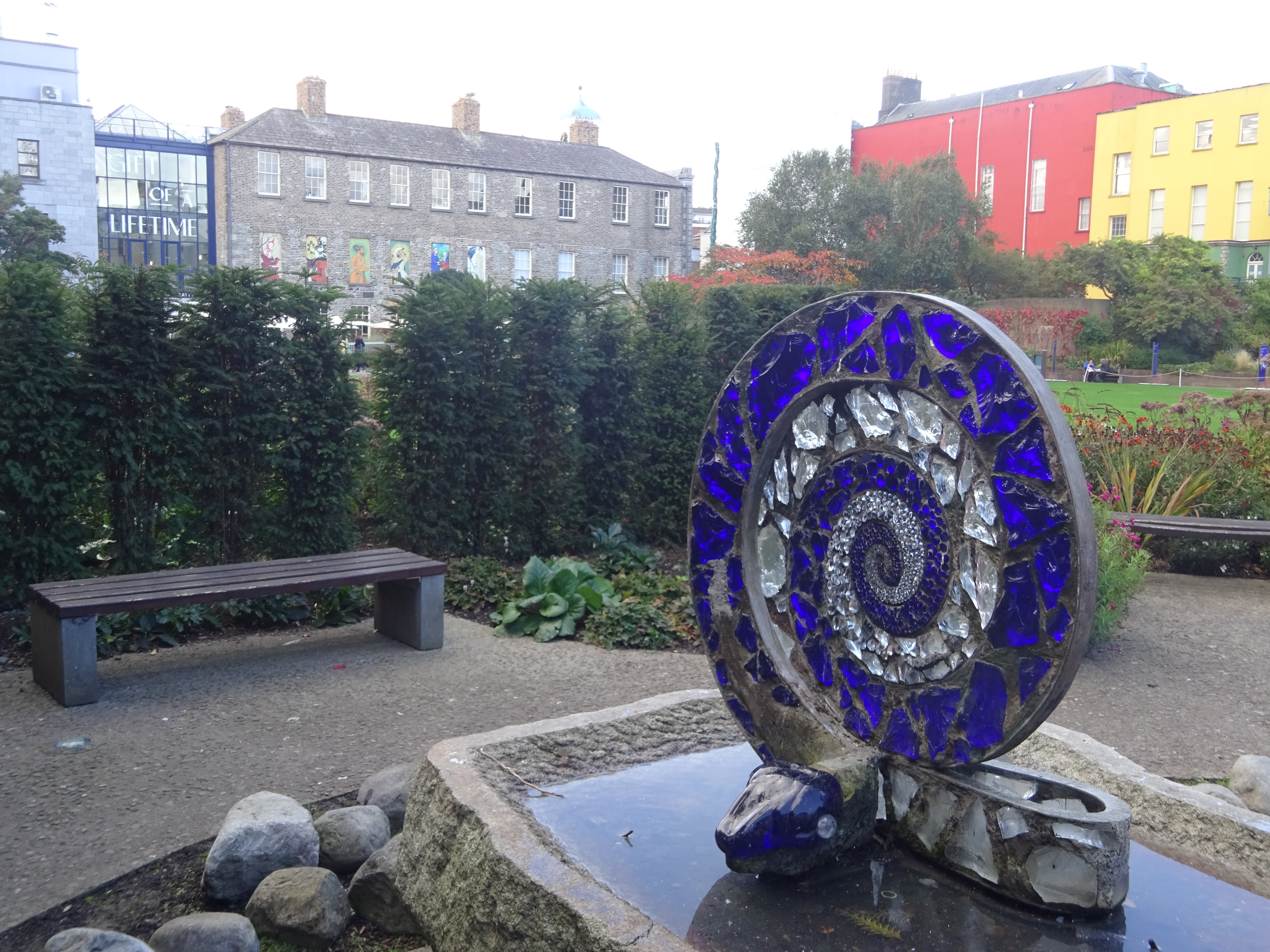
Memorial in Dublin Castle gardens

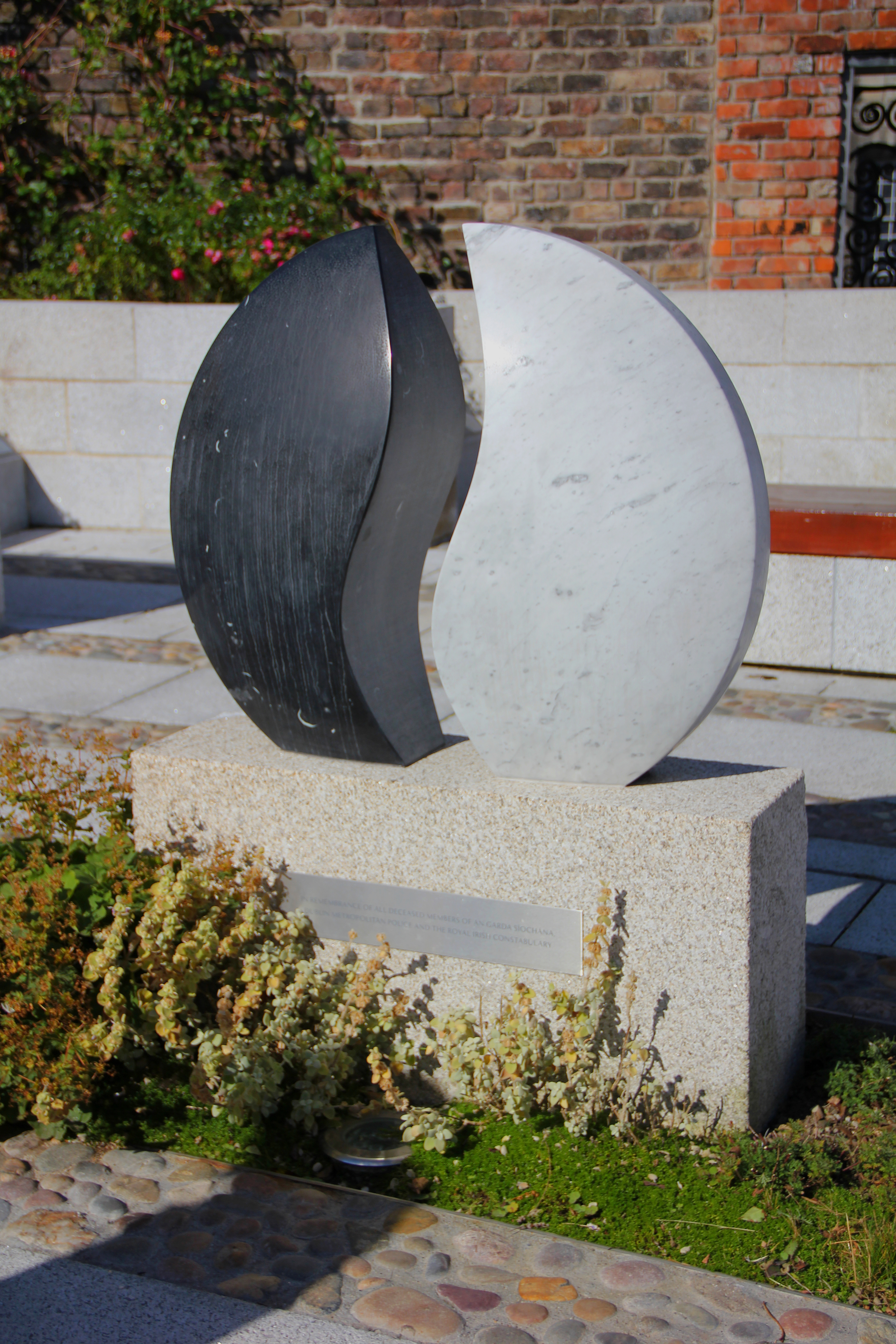
The Garda Síochána Memorial Garden, Dublin Castle

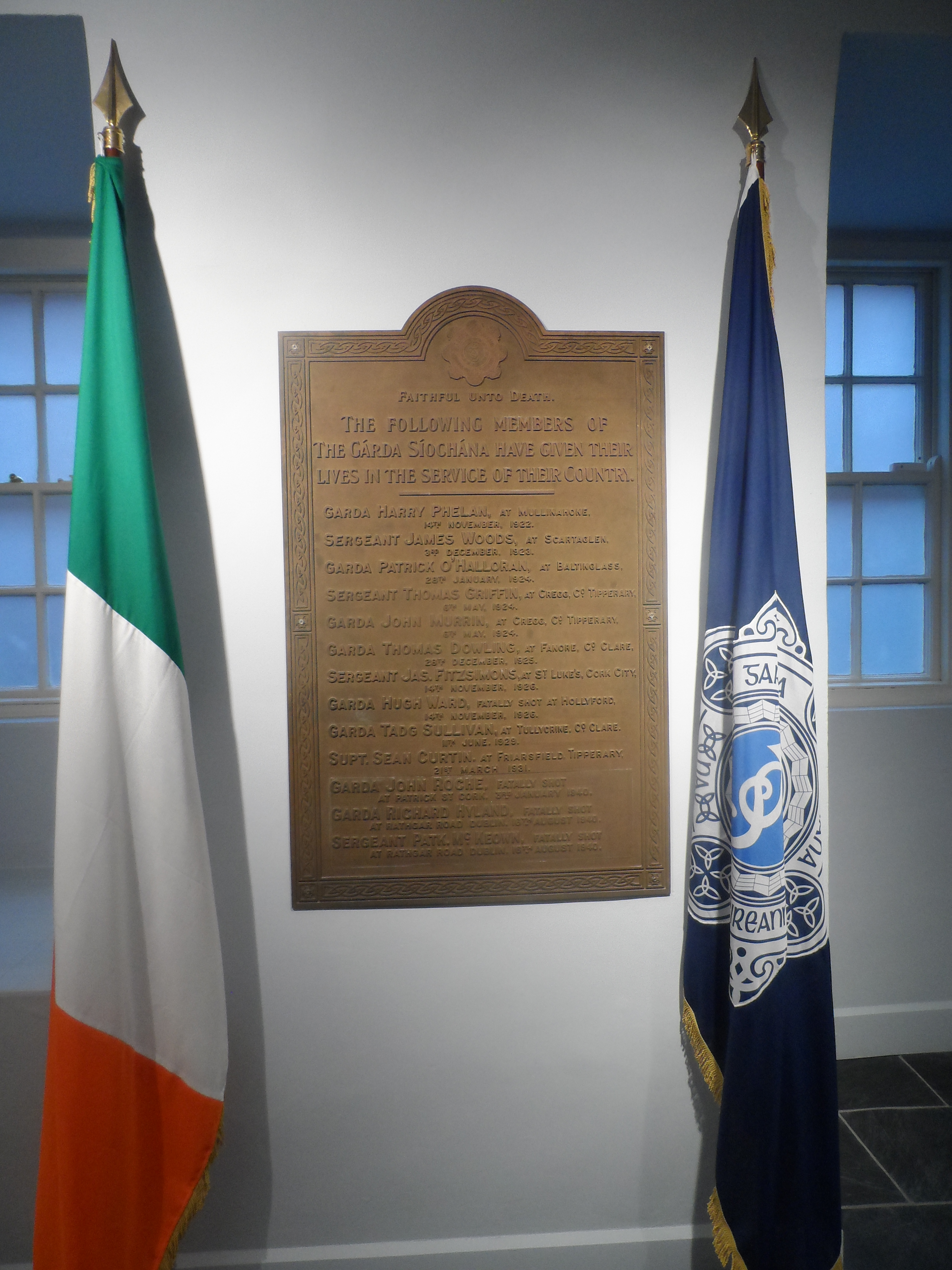
Roll of honour at the Garda Museum; it only lists names up to 1940.

This is a list of Garda officers killed in the line of duty since the establishment of the Garda Síochána in 1922. The list includes all Gardaí who were killed in the service of the state (accidentally and unlawfully), as per the official Garda Síochána Roll of Honour. The list does not include members of previous police services or other law enforcement agencies in the Republic of Ireland, nor those in Northern Ireland.

At least 23 serving Gardaí have been killed by individuals or groups associated with the Republican paramilitary groups, this being the most common cause of death apart from accidents.

The most recent death was that of Garda Kevin Flatley, who was killed in May 2025, becoming the 90th member of the force to die on duty.

== Garda Síochána Roll of Honour ==
Note: Coloured rows denotes when officers were killed in the same incident.

Name	Rank	Reg. No.	Age	Date of death	Circumstances	Location
Kevin Flatley	Garda	27260D	49	11 May 2025	Struck by a motorcycle while carrying out a speeding checkpoint on the R132 road.	Donabate, County Dublin
Colm Horkan	Detective	26225M	49	17 June 2020	Murdered after being disarmed and shot with his own service pistol, during an incident on a mobile anti-crime patrol	Castlerea, County Roscommon
Tony Golden	Garda	29909L	36	11 October 2015	Murdered while attending a domestic dispute by dissident republican Adrian Crevan Mackin, who also shot and critically injured his partner before taking his own life	Omeath, County Louth
Adrian Donohoe	Detective	26222F	41	25 January 2013	Murdered by a criminal gang with links to dissident republicans during a credit union robbery	Jenkinstown, County Louth
Ciaran Jones	Garda	34104E	25	24 October 2011	Accidentally swept away and drowned during floods while trying to warn motorists of the danger	Kilbride, County Wicklow
Gary McLoughlin	Garda	31917A	24	12 December 2009	Unlawfully killed after the vehicle he was pursuing rammed his vehicle intentionally	Bridgend, County Donegal
Robbie McCallion	Garda	31285A	29	7 April 2009	Killed after being hit by a vehicle driven by fleeing suspect he and colleagues were attempting to apprehend while stealing another vehicle	Letterkenny, County Donegal
Brian Kelleher	Garda	23037E	46	25 February 2007	Accidentally killed by a vehicle while directing traffic away from the scene of an accident, fireman Michael Liston also died	Foynes, County Limerick
Paul Colleran	Garda	26973E	27	5 March 2003	Accidentally killed in a road traffic collision travelling from court to Garda station	Kinnegad, County Westmeath
Michael John Padden	Garda	27477A	27	14 April 2002	Killed in a vehicle collision attempting to intercept the vehicle of a robbery suspect	Stillorgan, County Dublin
Tony Tighe	Garda	17644C	53	14 April 2002	Killed in a vehicle collision attempting to intercept the vehicle of a robbery suspect	Stillorgan, County Dublin
John Nicholas Eiffe	Detective Sergeant	22294A	40	7 December 2001	Shot dead in a friendly fire incident during an arrest operation for the Garda National Surveillance Unit	Abbeyleix, County Laois
Desmond John Dixon	Detective	23363C	40	15 November 2001	Accidentally killed in a road traffic collision while on duty for the Garda National Surveillance Unit	Dundalk, County Louth
James Brendan McIntyre	Garda	26361C	29	22 April 2001	Accidentally killed in a road traffic collision while on mobile patrol	Ballyvolane, County Cork
George Brendan Rice	Garda	22336M	44	22 April 2001	Accidentally killed in a road traffic collision while on mobile patrol	Ballyvolane, County Cork
Conor Oliver Griffin	Garda	27489E	25	15 May 2000	Accidentally killed in a road traffic collision while responding to a callout	Finglas, County Dublin
Garreth Noel Harmon	Garda	26650G	28	15 May 2000	Accidentally killed in a road traffic collision while responding to a callout	Finglas, County Dublin
Ambrose Fogarty	Garda	26178E	27	26 September 1999	Accidentally killed in a road traffic collision while responding to Gardaí in distress	Enniscorthy, County Wexford
Richard Joseph Nolan	Garda	21244L	42	26 September 1999	Accidentally killed in a road traffic collision while responding to Gardaí in distress	Enniscorthy, County Wexford
Andrew John Callanan	Sergeant	22477D	36	21 July 1999	Set alight with petrol by deranged man who entered a Garda station, suffering fatal wounds	Tallaght, County Dublin
Eoin Peter Fitzgerald	Garda	26158M	25	26 January 1998	Accidentally killed in a road traffic collision while on patrol	Blackrock, County Dublin
Jeremiah Desmond McCabe	Detective	15860G	53	7 June 1996	Vehicle rammed, shot dead by Provisional IRA members during a cash-in-transit robbery	Adare, County Limerick
Paul Michael Reid	Detective Sergeant	20655E	39	18 May 1995	Suffered fatal injuries after being shot at by a sniper, causing him to crash the vehicle he was driving (on duty with the United Nations Protection Force)	Sarajevo (Bosnia and Herzegovina)
Michael Joseph Lawless	Garda	17751B	41	20 January 1993	Accidentally killed in a road traffic collision while en route to a union meeting	Cliffoney, County Sligo
William Anthony Roche	Garda	21738G	33	1 August 1992	Accidentally killed by a vehicle while investigating a road traffic collision	Newbridge, County Kildare
Declan Roe	Garda	23595D	29	13 July 1992	Accidentally killed in a road traffic collision while on road patrol	New Ross, County Wexford
John Edward Linehan	Garda	24015L	29	9 June 1992	Accidentally killed in a road traffic collision while on official motorcycle training	Tullamore, County Offaly
Joseph F.X. Wilkinson	Garda	13716B	52	14 February 1990	Accidentally killed in a road traffic incident while transferring a prisoner	Cashel, County Tipperary
John McMahon	Garda	15062B	47	27 January 1990	Accidentally run over while on foot investigating criminal damage	Carlow, County Carlow
David Brian Dowd	Garda	22762E	26	18 February 1989	Accidentally killed when hit by a train while pursuing thieves on foot	Sutton Park, County Dublin
Cyril Patrick Hickey	Garda	24131H	25	8 December 1988	Accidentally killed in a road traffic collision while riding a motorcycle for the Garda Traffic Corps	South Quays, County Dublin
Noel Martin Conroy	Garda	19207D	36	28 October 1988	Accidentally killed in a road traffic collision while on official motorcycle training with the Garda Traffic Corps	Birr, County Offaly
Patrick Joseph Morrissey	Sergeant	14545K	49	27 June 1985	Murdered by the Irish National Liberation Army (INLA) following a bank robbery	Ardee, County Louth
Frank Hand	Detective	20594L	26	10 August 1984	Ambushed and killed by the Provisional IRA while on cash escort duty for the Garda Special Branch	Drumree, County Meath
Gary Sheehan	Recruit	23589L	23	16 December 1983	Fatally shot during the Don Tidey kidnapping by the Provisional IRA, Private Patrick Kelly (Irish Army) also killed	Ballinamore, County Leitrim
Denis Alphonsus Connolly	Garda	20676H	25	11 July 1983	Accidentally killed in a road traffic collision while on duty with the Garda Traffic Corps	Lemybrien, County Waterford
Declan Francis O'Connor	Garda	21517A	24	17 May 1983	Accidentally died after a road traffic incident on his motorcycle escorting a motorcade	Ballygall, County Dublin
Thomas J.A. Lawn	Detective	21096L	27	27 April 1983	Accidentally killed in a road traffic collision while on duty for the Garda Special Task Force	Clontarf, County Dublin
Patrick Noel McLoughlin	Sergeant	14679L	41	11 April 1983	Murdered at his home during the night by an assailant who fired from outside	Dunboyne, County Meath
John Joseph Brennan	Sergeant	16595F	37	4 August 1982	Accidentally killed in a road traffic collision on patrol	Naas, County Kildare
Nathy Cawley	Garda	16262M	37	24 February 1982	Accidentally killed in a road traffic collision while in a military explosives convoy	Broomfield, County Monaghan
Patrick Ruttledge	Garda	17003H	34	24 February 1982	Accidentally killed in a road traffic collision while in a military explosives convoy	Broomfield, County Monaghan
Patrick Gerald Reynolds	Garda	21281D	23	20 February 1982	Fatally shot by an Irish National Liberation Army (INLA) gunman after investigating a report of suspicious activity	Tallaght, County Dublin
James Gerard Downey	Garda	20018B	26	12 February 1982	Accidentally killed in a road traffic collision while en route to specialist training	Blackrock, County Dublin
Seamus Quaid	Detective	13497G	42	13 October 1980	Shot dead by a member of the Provisional IRA during an exchange of gunfire after stopping a vehicle containing explosives	Cleariestown, County Wexford
Henry Gerard Byrne	Garda	18300H	28	7 July 1980	Shot dead by the Irish National Liberation Army (INLA) following a bank robbery	Ballaghaderreen, County Roscommon
John F. Morley	Detective	15543H	37	7 July 1980	Shot dead by the Irish National Liberation Army (INLA) following a bank robbery	Ballaghaderreen, County Roscommon
Michael Augustine Clerkin	Garda	18189G	24	16 October 1976	Killed after entering a premises boobytrapped (IED) by the Provisional IRA, other colleagues seriously injured	Portarlington, County Laois
Michael Joseph Reynolds	Garda	17673G	30	11 September 1975	Shot in the head (off-duty) after following an armed gang who had robbed a bank	Killester, County Dublin
Walter James Hennelly	Garda	18137D	22	13 May 1974	Accidentally struck down and killed by a vehicle at a road checkpoint	Limerick, County Limerick
John Martin Lally	Garda	17992B	21	5 May 1973	Knocked down and killed while on foot at a checkpoint	Dundalk, County Louth
James Doody	Garda	16116M	28	7 January 1973	Accidentally killed in a road traffic collision while responding to an emergency	Cork, County Cork
Brian A. MacNeill	Garda	12689F	42	23 October 1972	Accidentally killed after being hit by a vehicle while conducting a roadside checkpoint	Charlestown, County Mayo
Samuel Donegan	Inspector	8586	60	8 June 1972	Killed by an IED laid by the Provisional IRA during a Garda/Defence Forces cross border search	Near Wattlebridge, County Fermanagh (Northern Ireland, United Kingdom)
Patrick Waters	Sergeant	10114	45	18 November 1971	Accidentally killed in a road traffic collision while responding to an emergency call	Sligo, County Sligo
Richard Christopher Fallon	Garda	9936	43	3 April 1970	Shot dead by members of Saor Éire during a bank robbery	Arran Quay, County Dublin
Seán Masterson	Garda	14676E	28	26 January 1970	Accidentally killed in a road traffic collision on a motorcycle while on traffic duty	Naas Road, County Dublin
Michael Joyce	Sergeant	6587	62	21 December 1967	Accidentally killed in a road traffic collision while en route to apprehend a fugitive	Balbriggan, County Dublin
John Michael Fitzsimons	Sergeant	10543M	33	15 March 1963	Accidentally stuck down and killed by a vehicle while investigating a road traffic collision	Monasterevin, County Kildare
John Flynn	Detective	10445M	32	16 November 1961	Accidentally killed in a road traffic collision while escorting a prisoner	Daingean, County Offaly
Thomas Michael O'Driscoll	Garda	10698	26	22 January 1958	Accidentally killed in a road traffic collision while on counter-IRA patrol	Redhills, County Cavan
Vincent Ryan	Garda	10094	29	18 September 1954	Accidentally killed in a road traffic collision while on motorcycle traffic duty	Killiney, County Dublin
Patrick Foley	Garda	8786	56	11 November 1953	Accidentally killed by a vehicle while on foot patrol	Ardnacrusha, County Clare
Richard Cody	Sergeant	1315	55	8 April 1952	Accidentally killed by a vehicle while on pedestrian duty	Tullow, County Carlow
Seán Gantly	Chief Superintendent	4804	49	21 January 1948	Shot dead accidentally during a search by detectives for escaped prisoners, was head of Garda Special Branch	Dublin Docklands, County Dublin
James Byrne	Garda	7779	38	25 September 1946	Shot dead while on plainclothes protection duty by a fellow officer, who was convicted of murder	Pallasgreen, County Limerick
Denis Harrington	Garda	4034	44	17 April 1944	Shot dead by a fellow officer in his Garda station, who then killed himself (murder-suicide)	Nenagh, County Tipperary
George Mordaunt	Detective	6712	45	24 October 1942	Shot dead during a raid on an IRA safe house by Garda Special Branch. An IRA member was subsequently executed for his role in the shooting.	Donnycarney, County Dublin
Michael Walsh	Detective	6658	41	1 October 1942	Shot dead attempting to apprehend a wanted criminal in a house raid	Kilnaleck, County Cavan
Denis O'Brien	Detective Sergeant	8288	43	9 September 1942	Ambushed and assassinated by the Anti-Treaty IRA at home because of his work for the Garda Special Branch	Ballyboden, County Dublin
Richard Hyland	Detective	8333	36	16 August 1940	Shot dead by members of the Anti-Treaty IRA during a Garda Special Branch raid	Rathgar, County Dublin
Patrick McKeown	Detective Sergeant	11919 (DMP)	39	16 August 1940	Shot dead by members of the Anti-Treaty IRA during a Garda Special Branch raid	Rathgar, County Dublin
John Gerald O'Donnell	Garda	6481	35	19 July 1940	Accidentally drowned after saving two girls from drowning at sea	Ballybunion, County Kerry
John Roche	Detective	4905	34	3 January 1940	Shot dead after stopping and attempting to question a member of the Anti-Treaty IRA on the street	St. Patrick's Street, Cork
Patrick Forde	Sergeant	5802	30	18 January 1934	Accidentally drowned after the vehicle left the road following a patient transfer	Connemara, County Galway
Michael Joseph Kennelly	Garda	1408	38	18 January 1934	Accidentally drowned after the vehicle left the road following a patient transfer	Connemara, County Galway
Eugene McCarthy	Garda	7912	25	8 January 1933	Accidentally drowned after rescuing a person from a river	George's Quay, County Cork
Patrick McGeehan	Detective	7794	28	14 February 1932	Fatally wounded after attempting to shield Patrick Reynolds from assassination while on close protection duty	Ballinamore, County Leitrim
John David Curtin	Superintendent	783	28	21 March 1931	Ambushed and assassinated by members of the Anti-Treaty IRA for his work combatting them	Tipperary, County Tipperary
Timothy O'Sullivan	Detective	6670	32	11 June 1929	Suffered fatal injuries following an IED explosion, which was set as a targeted trap	Knock, County Clare
William Nolan	Garda	11369 (DMP)	33	19 August 1928	Accidentally killed by a vehicle while directing traffic on foot	Stillorgan, County Dublin
James Fitzsimons	Sergeant	2566	23	14 November 1926	Murdered in his Garda station by members of the Anti-Treaty IRA	Cork, County Cork
Hugh Ward	Garda	5663	29	14 November 1926	Murdered in his Garda station by members of the Anti-Treaty IRA	Hollyford, County Tipperary
John Alphonsus Murrin	Garda	3919	26	19 October 1924	Fatally shot by an individual while entering a premises to investigate a shooting incident (Murrin died some months later, while Griffin died soon after)	Carrick-on-Suir, County Tipperary
Thomas Griffin	Sergeant	814	25	6 May 1924	Fatally shot by an individual while entering a premises to investigate a shooting incident (Murrin died some months later, while Griffin died soon after)	Carrick-on-Suir, County Tipperary
Arthur Nolan	Detective	11993 (DMP)	39	11 March 1924	Struck over the head with a hatchet in his Garda station on 29 February 1924 by an intruder and died on 11 March, worked for Dublin Metropolitan Police	Pearse Street, County Dublin
Patrick O'Halloran	Garda	651	27	29 January 1924	Shot dead at point-blank range pursuing armed criminal bank raiders	Baltinglass, County Wicklow
James Woods	Sergeant	2358	23	3 December 1923	Murdered in his Garda station after resisting an armed raid by insurgents	Scartaglen, County Kerry
Henry Phelan	Garda	1347	21	14 November 1922	Murdered in a sports shop by armed Anti-Treaty IRA intruders	Mullinahone, County Tipperary
Charles Eastwood	Civic Guard	1017	19	20 September 1922	Accidentally shot dead by a colleague	Ship Street Barracks, Dublin

== See also ==
- Scott Medal
- List of Irish military casualties overseas
- List of British police officers killed in the line of duty
- List of law enforcement officers killed in the line of duty in the United States
- List of New Zealand police officers killed in the line of duty
- List of People's Armed Police personnel killed in the line of duty
- Garda ar Lár
