= Murder of Tony Golden =

2015 shooting of a police officer in Ireland

- Location: Omeath, County Louth, Ireland
- Date: 11 October 2015; 6:30pm (GMT)
- Attack type: Shooting, murder-suicide
- Weapon: Glock 17 9mm
- Deaths: 2
- Injuries: 1
- Victim: Garda Tony Golden (shot dead)
- Assailant: Adrian Crevan Mackin (suicide)

Garda Tony Golden was an officer of the Garda Síochána, the national police service of Ireland, who was shot dead by a known dissident republican in a murder–suicide attack near Omeath, County Louth, Ireland on 11 October 2015, while on a domestic violence callout.

== Lead-up ==
Tony Golden was originally from Culleens, Ballina, County Mayo and was married with three young children. Garda Golden was attached to Omeath Garda Station and had lived in County Louth, Ireland for 6 years, having joined the force 10 years previously. He was 36 years old at the time of his death.

== Incident ==
On the evening of Sunday, 11 October 2015, Garda Golden – on duty, in uniform and unarmed – was shot dead by Adrian Crevan Mackin while accompanying Crevan Mackin's partner, who was also shot and critically injured during the incident. Adrian Crevan Mackin is believed to have turned the gun on himself and committed suicide. Golden was accompanying Crevan Mackin's partner while she collected her belongings to move back to her own family home to escape Crevan Mackin’s abuse. Her father remained alone in the waiting patrol car outside the house on the Mullach Álainn estate in North Louth and raised the alarm when gunshots were heard. Garda Golden was credited with laying down his own life and saving the life of the young woman. He is credited with the decision to tell the woman's father to stay in the Garda car, a decision that may have saved the man's life.

== The suspect ==
Adrian Crevan Mackin was well known to both the Gardaí and the Police Service of Northern Ireland (PSNI) as an active dissident republican, and was on bail awaiting terrorism charges for membership in the Irish Republican Army in the Republic of Ireland at the time of the shooting having been brought before the Special Criminal Court in Dublin earlier in 2015.

Crevan Mackin had been investigated by authorities from Ireland, the United Kingdom and the United States on suspicion of dealing illegal firearms, and his home was raided and searched by the Special Detective Unit in January of the same year as the incident acting on information supplied by the FBI. He was arrested and questioned but no charges were filed relating to firearms, despite evidence of firearm paraphernalia and bomb-making equipment being recovered from his home.

Crevan Mackin had been previously convicted of attempted murder as a youth, and possessing illegal pornographic images on his mobile phone in Northern Ireland. He had also been under investigation by the PSNI for threatening the lives of two female officials from social services in Northern Ireland who were investigating him for domestic abuse of his girlfriend.

== Aftermath ==
Garda Golden was fatally shot with an illegally held 9mm Glock semi-automatic pistol, and there was more ammunition found on the premises during follow-up searches.

Reports indicate another Glock handgun, was recovered in the deceased suspect's car, along with 700 rounds of pistol ammunition and cans filled with petrol – indicating Crevan Mackin may have been planning a mass-casualty attack which was interrupted by Garda Golden.

Questions and concerns were raised about why a lone unarmed Garda would be sent to the home of a known violent terrorist suspected of importing and selling guns, why the killer was still in possession of illegal firearms and illegal ammunition while on bail relating to terrorism charges, and why he was on bail at all – a decision the DPP did not object to. Further issues were raised about cutbacks to Garda resources and the lack of personal protective equipment for regular uniformed members.

The incident came less than 3 years after Detective Garda Adrian Donohoe was fatally shot just several kilometres away by a criminal gang with links to dissident republicans.

Garda Golden, in service of the state, was afforded a full state funeral on 15 October 2015 which took place at Saint Oliver Plunkett's Church, Blackrock, County Louth. The Anthony Golden Memorial Hurling Tournament was established in 2016 near Culleens National School, close to Ballina, County Mayo, to commemorate Garda Tony Golden. The tournament, named in his honor, is organized annually by the Ballina Stephenites GAA club and features participation from local schools to promote youth involvement in hurling.

== See also ==
- List of Gardaí killed in the line of duty
- Killing of Adrian Donohoe
