= Bellurgan =

Townland in County Louth, Ireland

Bellurgan Baile na Lorgan
- Townland
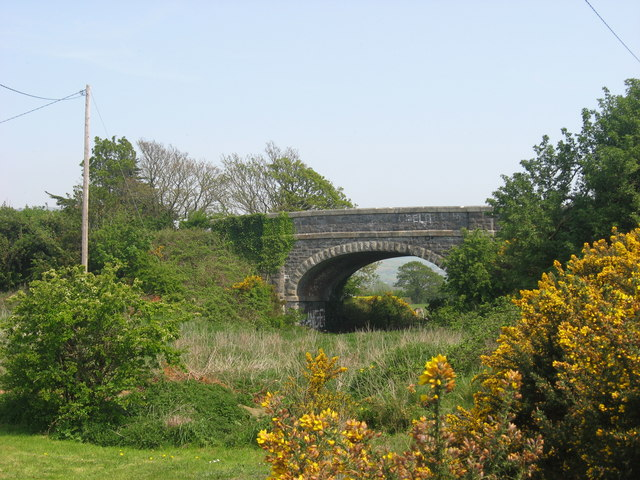
- Disused bridge, of the former Dundalk, Newry and Greenore Railway, at Bellurgan Point

- Location in Ireland
- Coordinates: 54°01′26″N 6°19′37″W
- Country: Ireland
- Province: Leinster
- County: County Louth

Bellurgan (Irish: Baile na Lorgan) is a townland in the northeast of County Louth, Ireland. Located approximately 6km from the town centre of Dundalk, as of the 2011 census the townland had a population of 665 people. Bellurgan townland has an area of approximately 8.44 square kilometres (3.26 sq mi).

Its Irish name, Baile na Lorgan, derives from "baile" (meaning townland, town or homestead) and "lorgain" or "lorga" (long low ridge or strip of land).

== Amenities ==
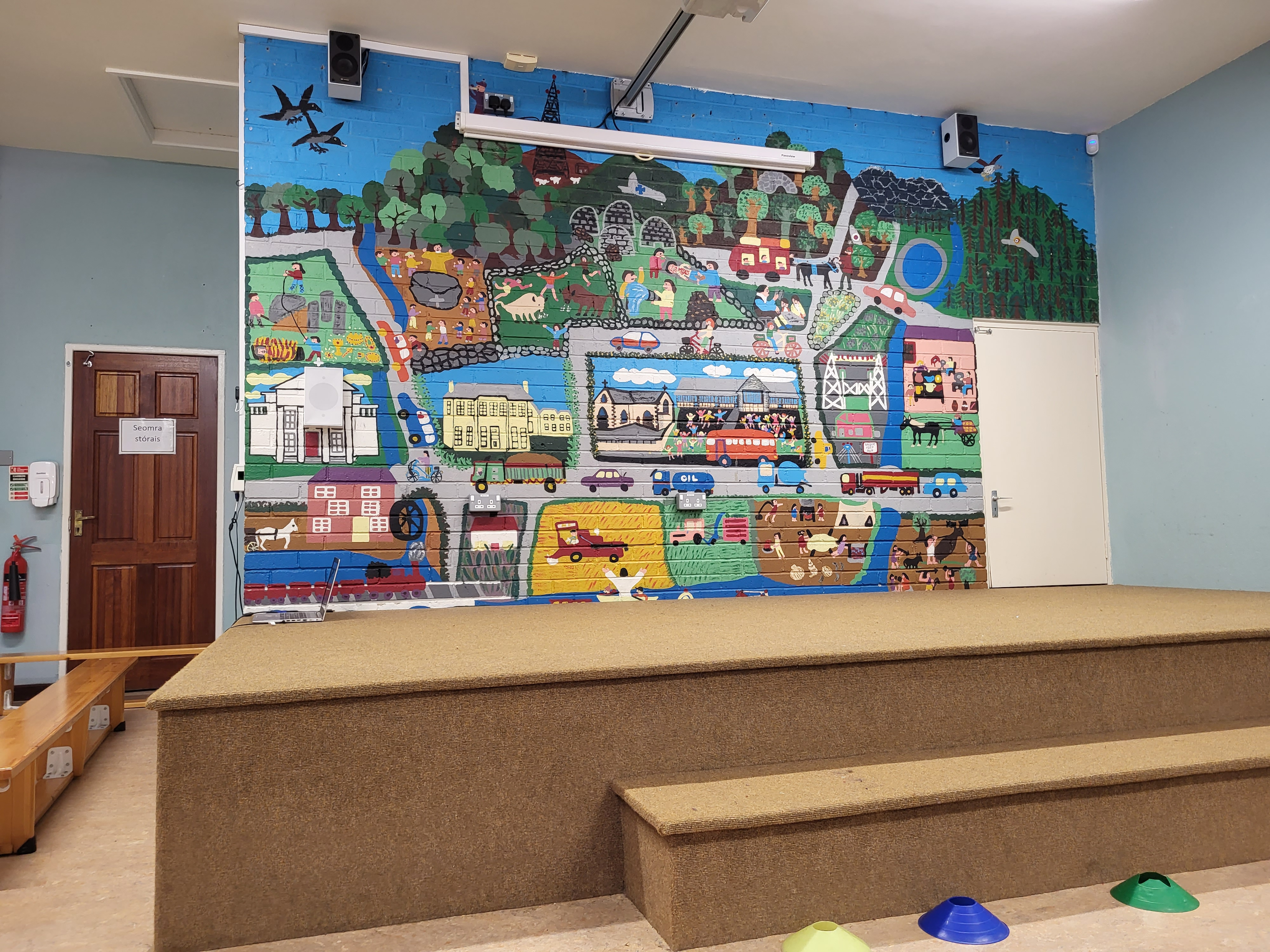
Mural at Bellurgan National School

The local national (primary) school, Bellurgan National School, had an enrolment of 124 pupils in 2023. The school, formerly operating from a smaller building opened in 1912, moved to a new location in 1980.

Founded in 1936, Bellurgan United Football Club is a local association football (soccer) club.

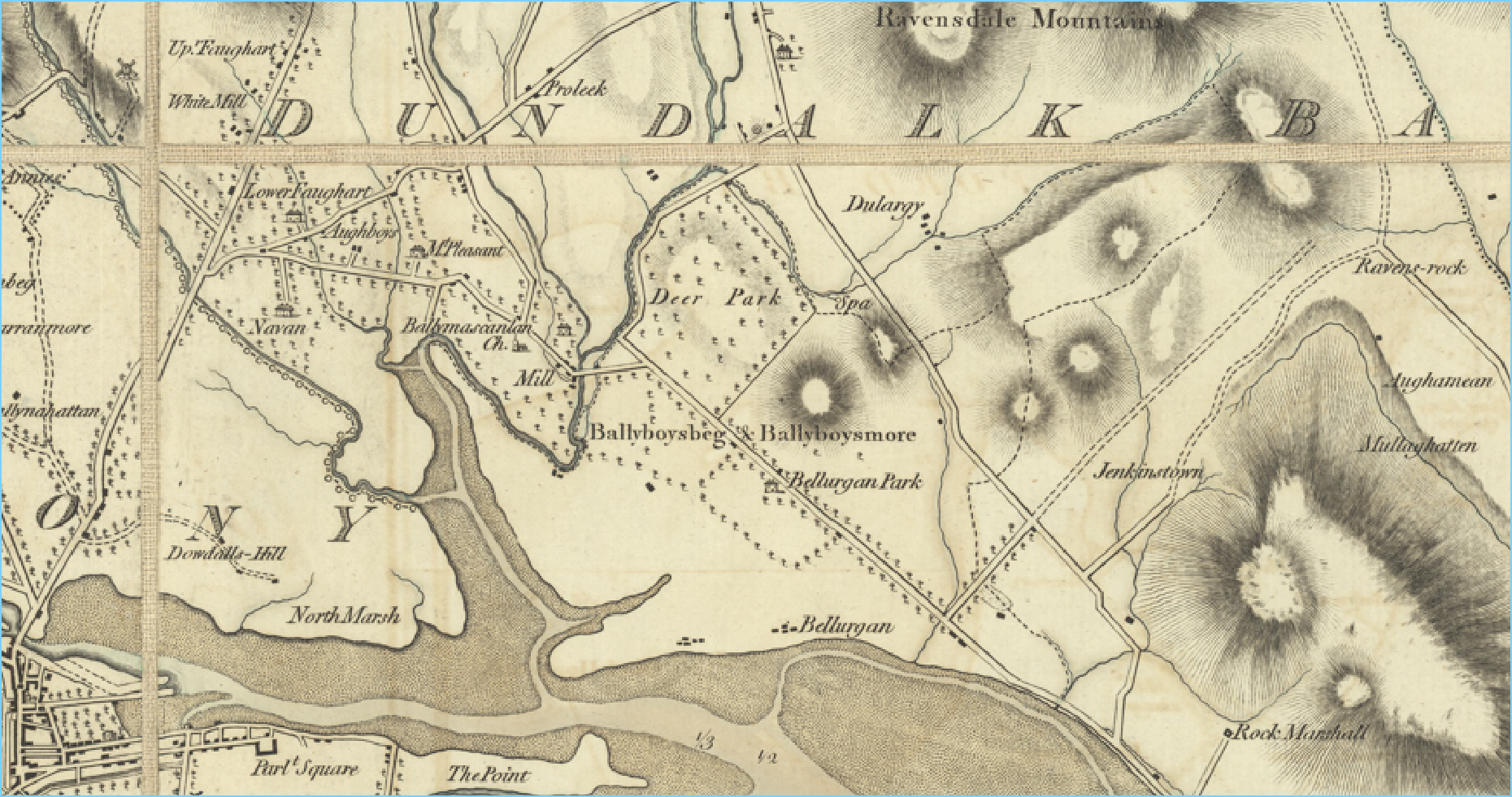
A map, dated to 1777, which shows the area and borders of Bellurgan

Lordship Credit Union, which has premises in Bellurgan, is a credit union named after Lordship, a village 4.5 kilometres (2.8 mi) east along the R173 road. In 2013, Garda detective Adrian Donohoe was shot dead the car park during the robbery of a cash-in-transit van he was escorting.

== Built heritage ==
Bellurgan Park house is a detached seven-bay two-storey house which was built c. 1790. There is a three-bay two-storey house, built c. 1740, attached to the east. The main building, together with the earlier mid-18th century house to which it is attached, was built by the Tipping family. Members of this family had been living in the area since the 17th century.

== Transport ==
=== Old Road ===
The Old Road in Bellurgan was once the main thoroughfare from Carlingford and indeed the whole Cooley peninsula to Dundalk, the road used to travel straight through Bellurgan park passing the back of the old estate house where there was access to drinking water for horses as they passed.

=== Former railway station ===
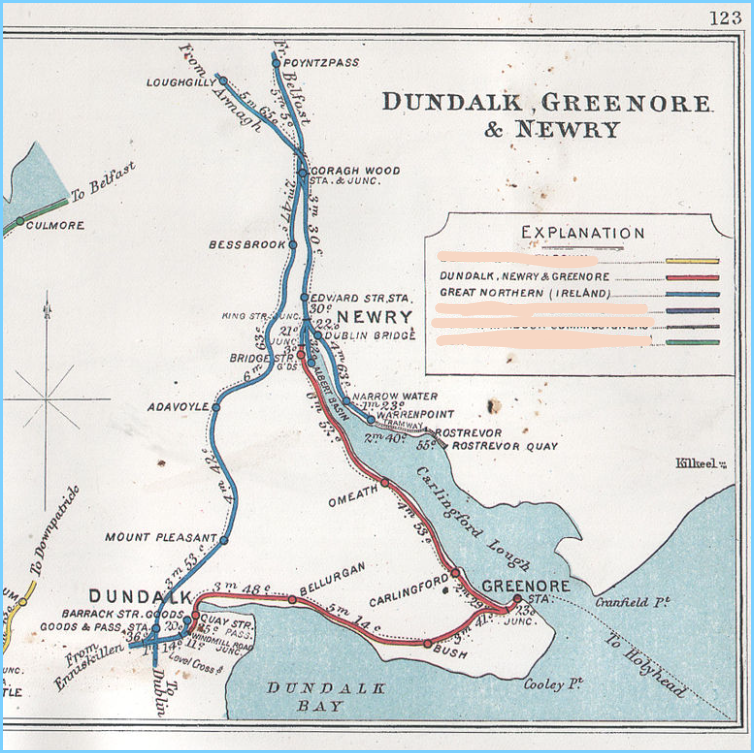
Dundalk Bellurgan Greenore Newry Railway map

The 26-mile (42 km) Dundalk, Newry and Greenore Railway was an Irish gauge (1,600 mm (5 ft 3 in)) railway which passed through the area. It opened in the 1870s to provide a link between Dundalk and the port at Greenore, from where a ferry service operated to Holyhead. The station at Bellurgan was the first stop, outside Dundalk, on the route to Greenore. The line closed in 1951 and the station building was subsequently used as a private home.

== See also ==
- Ballymascanlan, a townland which borders to the west
