= Frank Hand =

Detective Garda Frank Hand was an Irish police officer who was killed in the line of duty by the Provisional Irish Republican Army on 10 August 1984.

== Background ==
Born in 1958 to a family of seven from County Roscommon, Hand joined the Garda Síochána in 1977, becoming a detective in 1981. He worked in Donnybrook and Irishtown in Dublin, and subsequently worked with the Drug Squad. Early in 1984, he was assigned to the Central Detective Unit at Harcourt Square. In July 1984 he married Breda Hogan (also a member of the Garda Síochána), returning from their honeymoon in Venice at the start of August.

On 10 August 1984, he and Detective Garda Michael Dowd were escorting a cash delivery to a post office in County Meath. Hand was armed with a Smith & Wesson .38 Special, Dowd with an Uzi.

At Drumree Post Office they were attacked by the Provisional Irish Republican Army, who opened fire on the Gardaí. Both were injured, Detective Hand subsequently dying of his wounds. He was one of some sixteen members of the Garda Síochána killed by Irish republicans during The Troubles, and one of thirty-five gardaí killed while on duty, many by the IRA.

Patrick McPhillips, Thomas Eccles and Brian McShane were convicted and sentenced to death, which was commuted to 40 years imprisonment.

In 1998, his brother criticised the Irish government for not consulting his and other families about the release of the killers of his brother, pointing out that he had only found out about the potential releases by accident:

I would accept that there has to be compromise and obviously Northern Ireland has been a very difficult problem. However, in my view the Republic of Ireland was a separate sovereign state; at the time Frank was shot the Republic of Ireland was not at war and I find it very hard to accept that Frank's killers, if you like, should be part of the agreement at all. It is a small comfort, but it is a comfort to know that people who were convicted were doing time ... that at least Frank's life and his work for the State had not been in vain.

We gradually have resigned ourselves to the fact that we are a pebble on the beach, so to speak. There are bigger political agendas at work and we feel that we have no way of influencing these. We feel that the more we push, the more grief and hardship we're bringing on our individual family members and accordingly, I suppose, we have withdrawn, and we'd like to retain our dignity and not get involved in unseemly squabbles. ... one of our biggest gripes was the total lack of consultation and the minister and his officials did give us a firm commitment that there would be consultation and advice from here on out. However, that has not been the case.

== See also ==
- List of Irish police officers killed in the line of duty
- Murder of Michael Reynolds
- Murder of Henry Byrne and John Morley
- Gary Sheehan
- Murder of Jerry McCabe
- Shooting of Adrian Donohoe
