= Death of Samuel Donegan =

1972 Provisional IRA killing

Inspector Samuel Donegan (20 November 1911 – 8 June 1972) was a member of the Garda Síochána who was killed by a booby-trap bomb left by the Provisional Irish Republican Army (Provisional IRA) in 1972.

== Early life ==
Samuel Donegan was born on 20 November 1911, and he was a native of Ballintampen (also spelt as Ballintempan), a townland just south of Longford in County Longford.

== Garda career ==
Donegan joined the Garda Síochána, the Republic of Ireland's police force, at the age of 23, on 4 September 1934, being issued with the Service No. 8586. He received a promotion to the rank of Sergeant in 1952. He had served attached to Garda stations in County Mayo and County Sligo in the early part of his career until being promoted to the rank of Inspector in 1967 when he was transferred to the County Cavan district.

== Booby-trap at Drumboghangh ==
On 8 June 1972, Inspector Donegan was leading a Garda patrol in conjunction with an Irish Defence Force detachment on the border between County Cavan, part of the Republic of Ireland, and County Fermanagh, part of Northern Ireland. In the Drumboghanagh neighbourhood, very near Wattlebridge, a few miles south of Newtownbutler, they found a tea-crate apparently abandoned in the road painted with comical style lettering saying "BOMB!", which on examination turned out to be empty. Further along the Drumboghanagh Road, a country lane, the patrol found a second identical tea-crate, which suddenly detonated whilst they were examining it, killing Donegan. Donegan was in his 37th year of police service and was 60 years of age.

== Subsequent events ==
In January 2013, Sinn Féin President Gerry Adams issued a statement in which he apologised on behalf of the IRA to the families of Gardaí and the families of all members of State forces injured or killed by the Provisional IRA, but denied knowledge of who was responsible for planting the bomb that had killed Inspector Donegan.

== See also ==
- List of Gardaí killed in the line of duty
- Death of Adrian Donohoe
- Michael Clerkin
- Death of Jerry McCabe
- Deaths of Henry Byrne and John Morley
- Michael J. Reynolds
- Murder of Eamon Ryan
- Murder of Patrick Kelly
