= Richard Fallon (police officer) =

Richard Christopher Fallon (18 December 1926 – 3 April 1970) was an Irish police officer who received the Scott Medal. He was the first member of the Garda Síochána to be killed in the line of duty as a consequence of The Troubles

== Early life ==
Fallon was a native of Moneen, Kilrooskey, in County Roscommon. He was initially employed in farming, before joining the police service. Before his police career he had been a soldier in Ireland's 'Local Defence Force', a reserve formation of the Irish Army.

== Police service ==
Fallon joined the Garda Siochana on 5 November 1947, as Officer No.9936; simultaneous to his own career with the force he had 3 brothers also serving with it. In 1970 he was attached to the Mountjoy Garda Station in Dublin.

== Arran Quay shooting ==
On the morning of 3 April 1970 three armed members of the Irish Republican paramilitary organisation Saor Éire were in the process of robbing a branch of the Royal Bank of Ireland at Arran Quay in Dublin, as part of a spree of bank robberies the organisation had conducted in the Republic of Ireland from 1967 onwards in pursuance of finance for operations in Northern Ireland. When Gardaí Paul Firth and Richard Fallon arrived, without firearms to defend themselves, on the scene in their patrol car, the police had been alerted that something was wrong at the location by the gang's cutting off the bank branch's telephone wires. On confronting the three gunmen in front of the bank, Firth and Fallon were repeatedly fired at. Firth, who was behind Garda Fallon, called back to another police officer still in the patrol car to call for help on the radio, before diving to the ground to avoid the bullets aimed at him. Ignoring the fire, Fallon went forward to grab one of the gunmen, and was fatally shot in the neck and shoulder by one of the other two. The paramilitary robbery gang afterwards fled the scene having stolen £2000 from the bank branch.

Fallon was in his 45th year. He was the first member of the Garda Síochána to be murdered in the line of duty for almost three decades.

== State funeral & honours ==
Fallon's body was accorded by the Irish Government a state funeral, with up to 1000 Garda officers attending its course, and was buried at the Saints Peter & Paul Cemetery, at Balgriffin in North Dublin. He was posthumously awarded the Garda Siochana's Scott Medal, for heroism in the line of duty.

== Statement by Saor Éire ==
During the subsequent Garda investigation of the murder, which included multiple arrests of people in the Irish Republic known to have associations with Saor Éire, and a public issuance of a wanted list by the Government of several named individuals sought in connection with the crime, Saor Éire's Command issued a public statement denying the involvement of its members in the robbery and shooting, and calling for a public enquiry to be set up by the Irish Government into it. A subsequent statement from the organization referred to the Irish Government's investigation of the murder as 'bogus', and described the ongoing criticism in the Dublin press of Saor Éire for the murder as 'hysterical', and 'anti-socialist' in motivation, ending its statement with: "We deny that Garda Fallon was killed ... in the course of protecting the public. He died protecting the property of the ruling class, who are too cowardly and clever to do their own dirty work."

== Government collusion with paramilitaries allegations ==
Shortly after the murder, persistent rumours began circulating in the Dublin press, informed by high-level sources within the Garda and political circles in the Dail, that the perpetrators of the murder from the Saor Éire organisation had been given illicit protected status by the Irish Government after the shooting. The rumours further stated that this was carried out in order to cover up collusion between highly placed people within the Government, and the Dublin political class, who were involved in facilitating the illegal passage of fire-arms through the Irish Republic into Ulster to equip Irish Republican paramilitary groups that were forming there in the midst of the communal violence that had broken out in 1969, and that the firearms used in the murder of Garda Fallon could potentially be traced to an origin that would reveal such activity. Gerry L'Estrange, a Member of Parliament, stated on the floor of the Dail on 4 November 1971 that one of the three-man robbery team that had killed Garda Fallon had been escorted out of the Irish Republic into Ulster and the United Kingdom via an Irish Government state car, under the authority of a Government Minister. L'Estrange didn't name the Minister at the time, but press commentary later, in conjunction with Garda off-the-record sources, stated that Neil Blaney was the Minister being referred to.

Three alleged members of Saor Éire, Patrick Francis Keane (arrested and extradited to the Republic of Ireland for the trial from Ulster by the British Government), and John ("Sean") Morrissey and Joseph Dillon (both apprehended in Dublin by the Garda using automatic fire from a Tommy Gun to capture them), were subsequently charged with the murder and bank robbery, standing trial before a jury in 1971 and 1972 at the Central Criminal Court in Dublin, but they were found not guilty. The perceived inadequacy of the trial led to the reactivation of the Special Criminal Court, a juryless court previously used for trials of IRA actions during the Second World War and again in the latter stages of its 1956–62 border campaign.

In 1980 the Irish TD Garret FitzGerald stated that the revolver that had been used to murder Fallon had been imported into Ireland through Dublin Airport in 1969, "with the knowledge of the then Irish Government", and called upon three Cabinet Ministers, including the former Taoiseach Jack Lynch, and Defence Minister Jim Gibbons, of that Administration "to say what they know" of the matter.

The sons of Garda Fallon in later years also raised concerns that there had been some government involvement in assisting the men who murdered their father to elude justice, and politically campaigned on the issue through the media. In July 2001 Des O'Malley publicly stated in the Dail that there were grounds to believe that the gun that was used to murder Garda Fallon in 1970 had been part of an arms shipment that had been previously illegally passed through Irish state territory, and that senior Garda officers were of the view that a prominent political figure in the Dublin political order was associated with the movement of arms in question. Further press comment indicated that the politician in question was Charles Haughey, who later held the office of Taoiseach.

== Personal life ==
Fallon was married with 5 children, all under the age of 12 at the time of his death. One of his sons, Finian, unsuccessfully contested the 1998 Dublin North by-election for the Progressive Democrats.

== See also ==
- List of Irish police officers killed in the line of duty
