= Garryhinch ambush =

IRA attack against the Garda Síochána

Coordinates: 53°08′20″N 7°16′03″W

- Part of The Troubles
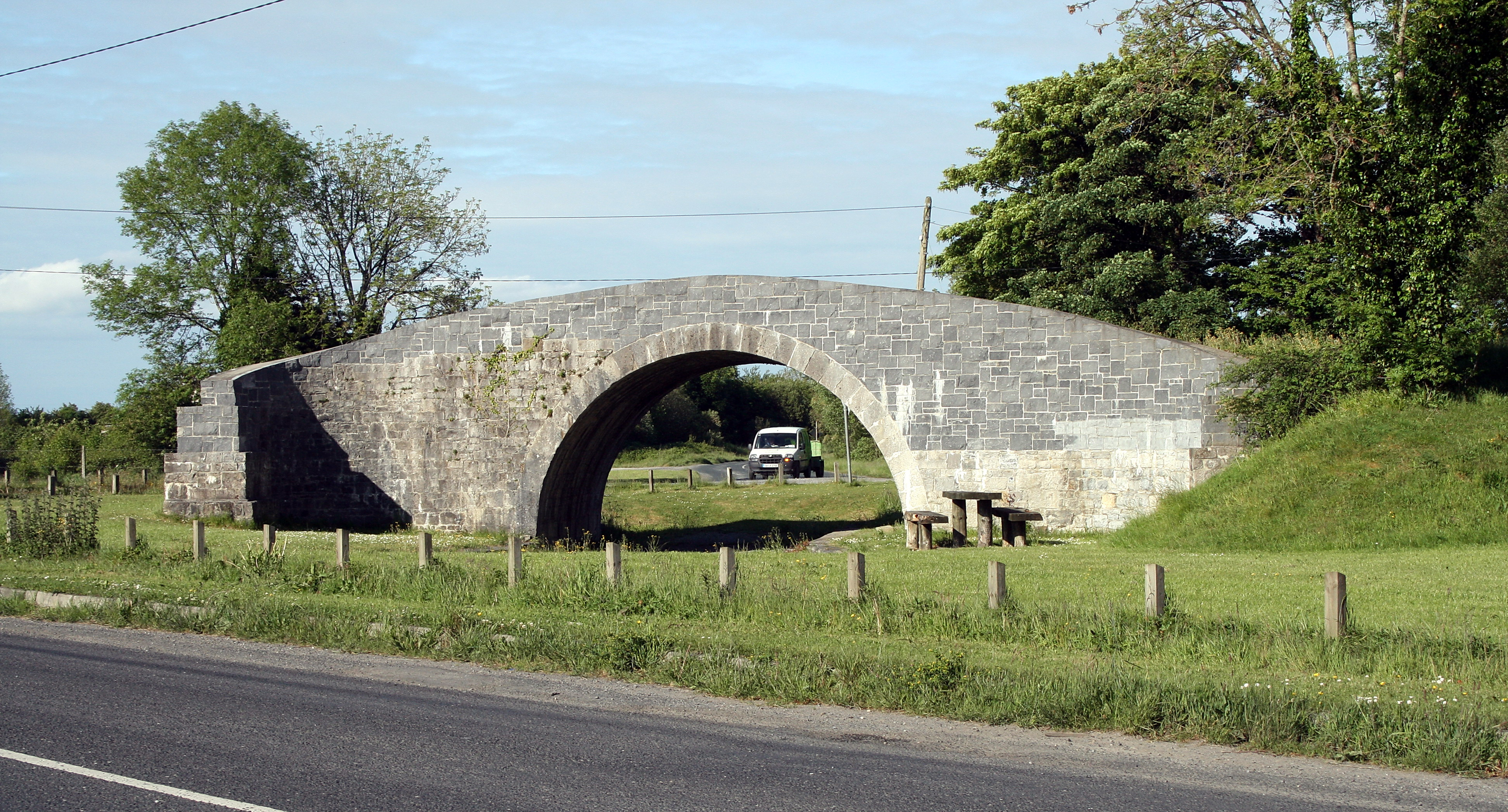
- Laois-Offaly border where the ambush happened

- Garryhinch ambush (Ireland)
- Location: Garryhinch, County Offaly, Ireland
- Date: 16 October 1976 (UTC)
- Attack type: Booby-Trap Bomb
- Deaths: One Garda killed
- Injuries: Four Gardaí badly injured
- Perpetrator: Provisional Irish Republican Army (IRA)

The Garryhinch ambush was a surprise attack on the Garda Síochána by the Provisional IRA on 16 October 1976. A bomb planted by the IRA in a farmhouse at Garryhinch on the County Laois-County Offaly border in Ireland was detonated. Garda Michael Clerkin was killed in the blast, and four other Gardaí at the scene were badly wounded. The incident was one of the few occasions during The Troubles when police officers in the Republic of Ireland were deliberately targeted.

== Ambush ==
On the night of 16 October 1976, the Gardaí received an anonymous telephone call stating that Provisional IRA members were at a vacant farm at Garryhinch, near Portarlington, County Laois, engaged in activity connected with a plot to target a local Fine Gael TD and Parliamentary Secretary to the Minister of Defence, Oliver J. Flanagan. Garda (equivalent rank to constable in other police forces) Clerkin and four fellow Gardaí (Detective Garda Tom Peters, Sergeant Jim Cannon, Detective Garda Ben Thornton, and Garda Gerry Bohan) were dispatched from Portarlington Garda Station to investigate the report. However, the telephone call was bogus and was from the IRA itself, aimed at luring Garda officers to the farmhouse as a part of a planned ambush by the organisation against the Irish Government in retaliation for its institution of the 'Emergency Powers Act' (1976), which passed into Irish Statute that same night, aimed at combating escalating paramilitary activity within the Republic of Ireland associated with the IRA's armed campaign.

Garda Clerkin, despite being an ordinary uniformed and unarmed garda, entered the premises via an open rear window, and moved through the building finding it to be apparently deserted; he opened the front door from within to admit his colleagues. The door was booby-trapped with a bomb, housed in a large used propane gas cylinder which had been dug into the ground beneath the floorboards of the farmhouse's entrance doorway, which was triggered and detonated upon the door being opened, killing Clerkin standing directly above instantly. On the building's outside, the rest of the Garda team were also caught in the blast, Detective Garda Peters being permanently blinded and deafened, and Det. Gda. Cannon, Det. Gda. Thornton and Garda Bohan also being wounded, the quantity of explosives utilised being of sufficient power to demolish the building. Clerkin was in his 25th year.

== Aftermath ==
The incident triggered a political crisis between the executive and President Cearbhall Ó Dálaigh, prompted by his earlier referring of the Emergency Powers bill to the Supreme Court. The Minister for Defense at the time, Paddy Donegan, called His Excellency a "thundering disgrace". President Ó Dálaigh resigned on 22 October "to protect the dignity and independence of the presidency as an institution".

The remains of Garda Michael Augustine Clerkin's body were buried at Latlurcan Cemetery in his hometown of Monaghan in the north of County Monaghan.

Although there were a number of arrests by the Garda in an intensive search across the Laois-Offaly district for the perpetrators of the ambush, which resulted in a signed confession from a prime suspect, no one has ever been convicted or brought to trial for it.

A memorial Mass for Clerkin on the 40th anniversary of the attack was held in Portarlington on 16 October 2016.

Michael Clerkin was awarded the Garda's Scott Medal posthumously on 8 December 2017 in a ceremony at the Garda Síochána College at McCan Barracks in Templemore, County Tipperary. A memorial plaque was erected to his memory in his home town of Monaghan in June 2018.

== See also ==
- 1975 Dublin Airport bombing
- Flagstaff hill incident
- Clontibret invasion

== Sources ==
- CAIN Web Service A Chronology of the Conflict - 1976
- RTE Archives - Booby trap kills Garda 1976
