= Murder of Adrian Donohoe =

Irish police officer murdered during an armed robbery in 2013

Adrian Donohoe
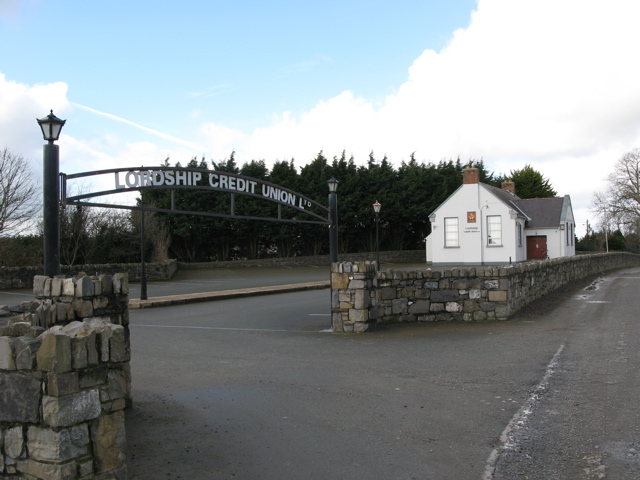
- Lordship Credit Union, the site where the attack occurred.
- Born: 14 January 1972; Kilnaleck, County Cavan, Ireland
- Died: 25 January 2013 (aged 41); Bellurgan, County Louth, Ireland
- Police career
- Department: Garda Síochána
- Service years: 1994–2013 (19 years)
- Rank: Detective Garda
- Badge no.: 26222F

Adrian Donohoe (14 January 1972 – 25 January 2013) was an Irish detective in the Garda Síochána (Irish police) based at Dundalk Garda Station in County Louth, who was fatally shot in Bellurgan (near Jenkinstown, County Louth) on 25 January 2013 during a robbery by an armed gang of five people on a credit union. He was the first garda officer to be murdered in the line of duty since 1996, and was afforded a full state funeral.

On 4 March 2018 at Dundalk District Court, 27-year-old Aaron Brady from New Road, Crossmaglen, County Armagh, was charged with Donohoe's murder and plead not guilty. Brady's trial began at the Central Criminal Court in Dublin on 28 January 2020.

On 12 August 2020, 29-year-old Aaron Brady was found guilty of the capital murder of Detective Garda Adrian Donohoe and was sentenced to the mandatory term of 40 years imprisonment. Brady was also sentenced to 14 years imprisonment for robbery at Lordship Credit Union.

In July 2021, 33-year-old Brendan Treanor from Dundalk was charged with the armed robbery of the Lordship Credit Union on the night Donohoe was murdered.

Also in July 2021, James Patrick Gerard "Jimmy" Flynn, 30, from south Armagh was arrested in the UK on foot of an extradition warrant issued by the High Court in Ireland. Gardaí told a court that Flynn had lived in the United States from 2013 to 2017 and described him as Aaron Brady's "best friend".

Jimmy Flynn and Brendan Treanor went on trial in the Special Criminal Court in February 2023, charged with the robbery of the credit union in Lordship and also with conspiracy to enter residential premises with the intention of stealing car keys. Legal proceedings ended in May 2023 after 55 days of legal argument, with verdicts due to be delivered in September 2023.

On 11 September 2023, James Flynn was found guilty of breaking into a house and stealing the keys of a car which was later used in the robbery of Lordship Credit Union and the capital murder of Adrian Donohoe. Flynn was found not guilty of the additional charge of robbery of €7,000 at the credit union. Brendan Treanor was found not guilty of both charges, however judge Mr Justice Hunt stated there was "clear evidence that establishes that Treanor is a member of a criminal gang along with others and was involved before during and after the robbery", but that charges of membership of a criminal gang had not been brought before the court. Flynn was remanded in custody for sentencing in November 2023.

== Personal life ==
Adrian Donohoe was born on 14 January 1972 in Kilnaleck, County Cavan to parents Peggy and Hugh Donohoe. He grew up on the family farm with his three brothers – Alan, Colm and Martin, and two sisters – Anne and Mary. He was a keen Gaelic footballer, and at 6 ft 4 in (1.93 m) he played midfield for his local club before going on to represent Cavan GAA at Under-21 level. He attended nearby primary and secondary schools, before joining the Garda Síochána in 1994. Two of his brothers also joined the force, and he met his future wife Caroline at the Garda Síochána College in Templemore, County Tipperary.

Caroline Donohoe, from County Clare and who also had family members serving with the Gardaí, was stationed with the Garda National Immigration Bureau (GNIB) in Dundalk Garda Station – the same building where her husband worked – and the couple had two young children, a boy and a girl aged 6 and 7 respectively, at the time of his death. Donohoe was described as a "father figure" in his community, and played and coached for his local GAA club, St Patrick's GFC, on the Cooley Peninsula. He served his entire 19-year career in Dundalk, rising to the rank of detective. The Donohoes lived 4 km away from where the shooting occurred, and both their children attended Bellurgan National School, directly across the road from the incident.

== Shooting and robbery ==
Death of Adrian Donohoe
- Date: 25 January 2013
- Time: 21:30 GMT
- Location: 54.01599°N 6.32330°W
- Motive: Armed Robbery
- Target: Lordship Credit Union
- Deaths: Garda Adrian Donohoe
- Suspects: Aaron Brady, Jimmy Flynn, Brendan Treanor & persons unknown

Detective Garda Adrian Donohoe and his colleague Detective Garda Joe Ryan were on a routine two-person cash escort on the evening of Friday, 25 January 2013. Ryan was driving an unmarked police car (a Toyota Avensis) with the call sign Papa Bravo 16; both detectives were wearing civilian clothing and carrying concealed Irish police issue sidearms (SIG Sauer P226 9mm pistols). The Garda Síochána are primarily an unarmed police force; however, certain units of the service are armed (such as detective units), and up to 25% of members are licensed to carry firearms. Although Garda detectives on cash escort duties had formerly been issued with Uzi submachine guns, a decision had been made by Garda authorities the previous year to withdraw the Uzi, as it was deemed unsuitable for use in confined spaces.

The pair were en route to meet local credit union officials at Omeath, Cooley and the Lordship Credit Union in Bellurgan, who would then travel in a three-car convoy to a bank in Dundalk town to lodge takings in a nightsafe. This was regular practice, and the protocol had been recently upgraded from an unarmed, uniformed garda escort to an armed, plain-clothes detective escort, following a robbery that happened at the credit union 18 months prior when €22,500 in cash and cheques was taken. There were no casualties in the previous crime. At 8:49pm, a dark coloured Volkswagen Passat was observed to have driven to the end of a laneway close to the back of Lordship Credit Union before returning onto the main road, which was subsequently determined to have dropped off four members of the robbery team.

At 9:30 pm, Donohoe and Ryan entered the car park of the Lordship Credit Union premises and they parked, as did another car that was accompanying them from another credit union branch. They both parked beside the car belonging to officials from Lordship, and waited for the credit union workers to get into their cars for the trip to Dundalk. At this point, a navy-blue coloured Volkswagen Passat – that had been waiting stationary on the hard shoulder of the road – drove across the road and blocked the entrance. Four members of the gang were hiding behind a wall surrounding the car park, all wearing balaclavas, while a fifth was driving the car. Two gang members quickly approached the detectives' car from the driver's side, and as Donohoe opened his passenger side door and stepped out to investigate why the car had blocked the entrance, he was instantly shot at close range in the head with a long barrelled shotgun by a masked raider. A single shot was fired without warning across the roof of the unmarked Garda car. It was dark, and before Ryan could realise what was taking place, he was held at gunpoint and ordered out of his car and onto the ground by a number of gang members possessing a shotgun, handgun and a hammer. Neither officer had time to draw their weapons. The raiders then broke into a car belonging to credit union staff from Lordship, which was carrying cash and cheques to the value of about €40,000, and threatened them but only took a bag with €4,000, mistakenly leaving behind more than €30,000. Ryan and the credit union staff were left physically uninjured as the gang of five fled the scene, but Ryan was dispossessed of his car keys in an attempt to hinder his reaction. It was only after the perpetrators had escaped that the alarm could be raised.

The emergency services pronounced Donohoe dead shortly after their arrival, despite the frantic efforts of his colleague Ryan to save his life. Garda Headquarters scrambled all available units in an attempt to catch the fleeing suspects, and alerted the Police Service of Northern Ireland (PSNI). However, it is understood they had escaped to Northern Ireland before the border was secured by police on both sides. The Republic of Ireland-United Kingdom border can be crossed by car in around 10 minutes from the Lordship Credit Union, and neither force is allowed to enter neighbouring territory. A Garda helicopter briefly entered UK airspace with permission during the search. A PSNI helicopter was also deployed during the search in the north. It is believed that after crossing the Ballymacscanlon roundabout outside Dundalk, the Passat drove up the Whitemills Road before crossing the border near Forkhill, which was approximately 9 kilometers from Lordship Credit Union. The Passat was then observed driving past Cortamlet primary school near Newtownhamilton in south County Armagh in convoy with another saloon car just after 10pm; a few days after the robbery, a Passat was found burnt out nearby on Cumsons Road, which is a remote forested laneway between the villages of Darkley and Newtownhamilton.

North Louth / South Armagh
Locations relevant to the night of 25 January 2013
1 Lordship Credit Union
2 Whitemills Road
3 Cortamlet Primary School
4 Passat burnt out at Cumsons Road

== Investigation ==
The PSNI carried out an extensive technical examination of the Passat and the surrounding area. This area became a focus of the investigation. The vehicle, a "graphite navy blue" in colour 2008 Dublin registered automatic Volkswagen Passat, was linked by detectives to the murder and it was confirmed that it had been stolen from the Clogherhead area of County Louth earlier that week, between 11:30 pm on Tuesday, 22 January and 4:30 am on Wednesday, 23 January. Gardaí and the PSNI believe another getaway car was used to collect those involved in the crime after setting alight the original getaway car, and that there was more than five suspects involved in the overall perpetration of the crime.

A full forensic examination was carried out at the scene over three days by the Garda Technical Bureau, assisted by the Divisional Scenes of Crime Unit. The Divisional Search Team was called in to search the vicinity of the scene. The hammer used by the raiders to break the window of one of the credit union cars was recovered at the crime scene.

Deputy State Pathologist Khalid Jaber examined the body at the site of the incident and subsequently conducted an autopsy at Our Lady of Lourdes Hospital in Drogheda. As is standard practice when a garda loses their life, the Garda Síochána Ombudsman Commission (GSOC) was notified, and their officials visited the scene.

Then Garda Commissioner Martin Callinan (who retired in March 2014) attended a case conference at Dundalk Garda Station on the weekend after Donohoe's death, where an incident room was established for the duration of the investigation. Commissioner Callinan announced the allocation of 150 senior detectives to the case. National specialist units were assigned to the investigation, including the Special Detective Unit (SDU), National Bureau of Criminal Investigation (NBCI) and Organised Crime Unit (OCU). The force's armed intervention teams – Emergency Response Unit (ERU) and Regional Support Unit (RSU) – were placed on alert in the aftermath.

In the early stages of the investigation, there were over 1,000 Garda officers attached to the investigation, making it one of the largest criminal investigations ever undertaken in the history of the state.

Gardaí established that five males were involved in the shooting and robbery itself, and belong to a larger criminal gang operating in the border region. Those responsible were believed to have fled to Northern Ireland after the killing, and remained there for some weeks. The leader of the five-man gang and main suspect in the murder was identified as a young man from the Crossmaglen area of south Armagh. It is understood he was known to Detective Donohoe, providing a possible motive for his murder. However, Donohoe was originally not scheduled to take part in the credit union cash escort, making a late shift change with the officer who was originally scheduled to take part in the escort.

In late February, over a month after Donohoe died, Gardaí held a press briefing at the Dublin Metropolitan Region (DMR) Headquarters in Harcourt Street, Dublin City. There was a renewed appeal for information made, and two replica exhibits of evidence were shown to the media for the first time. A precision panel beating hammer with a black rubber handle, a red painted section and a soft rubber head was found at the scene, and police asked the public for help in tracing its origins. Similar mallets are used by panel beaters or mechanics repairing motorcycles. Also, a distinctive green "Cosatto" high-backed children's car booster seat carrying a "Little Monster" motif as well as a graphic of a monster was in the car when it was stolen. The child car seat – suitable for babies and young children – cost €119 to buy, and may have been dumped, offered for sale or given as a gift as investigators believe the seat was taken out of the stolen vehicle before the vehicle was used in the killing.

In mid-April, Gardaí and the PSNI informed the public that the investigation teams were looking for information in relation to a white coloured Heavy Goods Vehicle (HGV) that was parked on the Shean Road, Forkhill, Armagh in Northern Ireland either side of 9.45 pm on 25 January 2013, the night Donohoe died. The white lorry may have been broken down, and a number of people were reportedly seen around the vehicle. The two police forces added that they wanted to speak to anyone who owned the truck, had recovered or serviced it, or anyone who saw any activity of this nature on Shean Road on the night of 25 January.

One year on from the murder of Detective Donohoe, the Garda Commissioner visited Dundalk Garda Station, and provided an update on the progress of the murder inquiry. Martin Callinan reiterated his commitment to bringing those responsible for the crime to justice, and revealed the international dimensions of the case, involving police forces and law enforcement agencies from the United Kingdom, Netherlands, United States and Australia, as well as Europol and Interpol. The Commissioner also praised the PSNI for their involvement in the investigation. By 25 January 2014, the anniversary of Donohoe's death, over 4,000 investigative tasks had been undertaken, 4,000 "structured" lines of enquiry were pursued, 2,100 statements were taken, in excess of 800 people interviewed, 400,000 hours of CCTV reviewed (the equivalent to 45 man-years), 1,200 exhibits of evidence gathered and more than 30 searches carried out under warrants during the 12 months of the investigation.

Succeeding Garda Commissioner Nóirín O'Sullivan reiterated her confidence in April 2014 that Adrian Donohoe's murderers would be brought to justice. The investigation into the murder is over 10 times the size of usual homicide investigations.

== Aftermath ==
The death of Adrian Donohoe was strongly condemned by the President of Ireland, Michael D. Higgins and the Taoiseach, Enda Kenny. Cabinet ministers in the Republic of Ireland and Northern Ireland also spoke out against the crime. Minister for Justice Alan Shatter said that those responsible for the murder had planned it, knew that there would be police attending the credit union for an escort, and that the officers were ambushed. He warned that the perpetrators would each face the mandatory 40 years in prison for killing a garda, regardless of who fired the shot if they did not turn themselves in. Commissioner Martin Callinan vowed to hunt down and apprehend the killers. The PSNI, under Chief Constable Matt Baggott, pledged their full cooperation and support to bring to justice the murderers.

There was widespread shock and outrage among the public on the island of Ireland following the shooting dead of Donohoe, and it was considered a "national tragedy". The last garda to be shot dead serving the state was Detective Garda Jerry McCabe in June 1996, by the Provisional Irish Republican Army (IRA) in County Limerick. Jerry McCabe's widow Anne McCabe spoke of her sympathy for the Donohoe family, and retired Detective Garda Ben O'Sullivan – who was shot but survived the same incident as Jerry McCabe – signed a book of condolence for Donahoe's family, friends and colleagues.

Irish television programme Crimecall aired on RTÉ in February, featuring Superintendent David Taylor from the Garda Press Office appealing to the public for their help in solving the case. A Facebook tribute to Donohoe amassed over 40,000 signatures within days of the killing. The Irish League of Credit Unions offered a reward of €50,000 for information leading to arrests and prosecutions in the investigation. This reward was added to by Crimestoppers, who put forward a "substantial, five-figure sum" a month after the incident.

On 18 May 2013, the family of Adrian Donohoe were presented with a special Garda remembrance medal in his honour. The medal was awarded to his widow, Caroline, during the annual Garda Memorial Day commemoration service held at Dublin Castle. The ceremony remembers all 87 members of the Gardaí who were killed in the line of duty.

Donohoe was posthumously awarded a People of the Year Award for his bravery and fearlessness in September 2013, eight months after his unlawful death. The award was presented in Citywest, Dublin by GAA personality Mícheál Ó Muircheartaigh, and was accepted by Caroline Donohoe. She spoke of Adrian as "the love of my life" and "the best father that any child could have", adding "I will miss him every minute of every day as long as I live".

== Funeral ==
Detective Garda Donohoe was given a full state funeral on 30 January 2013. The funeral mass took place at St Joseph's Redemptorist Church in Dundalk, and he was buried at Lordship Cemetery. There was an estimated 5,000 people present at the funeral, which included 3,500 Gardaí (2,500 uniformed and 1,000 plain-clothes) and 1,500 members of the locality and further afield. More lined the route as the procession made its way to the graveyard. It was the largest funeral in Ireland for a number of years. Among those in attendance were President Michael D. Higgins, Taoiseach Enda Kenny, Tánaiste Eamon Gilmore, Minister for Justice Alan Shatter and several senior government ministers, Garda Commissioner Martin Callinan, Irish Defence Forces Chief of Staff Lieutenant General Sean McCann, Cardinal Seán Brady, Northern Ireland Secretary of State Theresa Villiers, Northern Ireland Justice Minister David Ford and PSNI Chief Constable Matt Baggott. Fr Michael Cusack presided over the mass. Donohoe's colleague Joe Ryan, who was present when he was shot dead, was a pall-bearer at the funeral.

== Police inquiries ==
In late February 2013, six pre-planned searches were carried out in the Dundalk area by Gardaí investigating the murder. Two men were arrested under section 30 of the Offences Against the State Act 1939 and held at Drogheda Garda Station. A Garda spokesperson said that the arrests targeted criminal and subversive activity in the area, and were not directly related to the killing. Both men were released without charge.

In the first week of April 2013, a number of planned raids were carried out by Gardaí in County Louth. Detectives seized mobile phones and laptop computers in a raid at a property in Hackballscross, Dundalk and seized firearms, explosives and illegal drugs during another raid at a premises in Kilsaran, Castlebellingham. No arrests were made, but the teams involved in the searches were investigating criminal elements operating in the border regions between County Louth and County Armagh, including the gang said to be responsible for Donohoe's murder. Significant forensic examinations took place following the searches in both locations.

Also in April, heavily armed members from the PSNI Special Operations Branch (C4) raided four houses in south County Armagh and seized mobile phones and documentation, as well as taking away other material for forensic examination. Senior officers informed journalists that the searches had been intelligence-led, and were focused on suspected criminals or associates of members of the gang believed to have been responsible for the murder of Donohoe. No one was detained during the four searches, but officers said that the operation's primary objective was to gather evidence. Follow-up operations to the PSNI seizures were carried out a number of weeks later south of the border by Gardaí. Several search warrants were executed by investigators in the Carlingford area of Louth.

In early May 2013, numerous searches were undertaken by Gardaí in the town of Faughart, near Dundalk. Investigating detectives were backed up by the Emergency Response Unit, Regional Support Unit, National Bureau of Criminal Investigation, Garda Stolen Motor Vehicle Investigation Unit, Divisional Search Team and the Divisional Scenes of Crime Unit. The Garda Press Office did not disclose any results of the searches, citing "operational reasons".

== Suspects ==
Five main suspects were identified by Gardaí and the PSNI in the course of the investigation into the murder of Donohoe, all of whom were suspected of being present during the fatal shooting of the 41-year-old father-of-two, and the subsequent theft of cash and cheques from the scene. All five suspects were classified as young males, from either side of the Louth-Armagh border, part of a larger criminal gang of around 15 to 20 people, with connections through their family and acquaintances to dissident republican paramilitary and terror organisations. A number of the suspects had previous criminal convictions, as well as being implicated in other criminal investigations. One of the main suspects was previously arrested by Detective Garda Donohoe under suspicion of having carried out the armed robbery of €22,500 at Lordship Credit Union in August 2011, as well as a similar armed raid at Dundalk racecourse in the same year where €6,825 was stolen.

Police officers from the Republic and Northern Ireland established the identity of the suspect who fired the fatal shot, understood to be the leader of the five-man gang, as a male in his early 20s, and who grew up in Crossmaglen, County Armagh, with strong links to the Crossmaglen Rangers Gaelic Athletic Club. The gang also included a pair of brothers. None of the five main suspects were immediately arrested, and it is believed that Gardaí were preparing a "watertight" case to present to the Director of Public Prosecutions before any moves were made to apprehend those responsible. Such is the nature of the crime, that any suspect charged with murder or conspiracy to commit murder of a serving member of the Garda Síochána could be tried in the non-jury Special Criminal Court in Dublin, facing a sentence of 40 years imprisonment in the maximum security Portlaoise Prison.

It emerged that a number of the suspects made prepared statements to police on both sides of the border, with their legal representatives present, in the weeks after the murder. They were then questioned under caution by the authorities.

In March 2013, the prime suspect in the unlawful killing of Donohoe fled to the United States, according to senior Garda sources. The man – in his 20s and from south Armagh – travelled from Northern Ireland to mainland Britain, before boarding a flight to New York City using a British passport. Police in Ireland, Britain and the United States were powerless to prevent the suspect from travelling because there was no warrant for his arrest. However, it is known that the suspect therefore failed to show for a court sitting in Ireland for separate offences that took place before the incident in Bellurgan, County Louth. Once the suspect landed in the US, security services were made aware of his presence by the Gardaí. The New York City Police Department (NYPD) and Federal Bureau of Investigation (FBI) were furnished with the details of the suspect's identity, and the United States Marshals Service (USMS) was tasked with tracking the whereabouts of the suspect. Garda detectives also flew to the US, to help authorities trace the suspect's movements. The man was given a holiday visa by US officials upon entering the country.

Another accomplice is understood to have fled to Boston in April, before reuniting with the prime suspect in New York. In September, the girlfriend of the prime suspect – who is also herself under investigation after she provided an alibi for her boyfriend when questioned as to his whereabouts on the night of the murder to the PSNI – travelled to New York. US authorities were monitoring their movements.

In December 2013, two suspects in the murder investigation were questioned and forced to provide statements in New York to investigating Gardaí and American authorities. Senior detectives from the Garda National Bureau of Criminal Investigation travelled to the United States in late 2013, and in December they – accompanied by US law enforcement – brought two suspects in for questioning from a property in New York. Both suspects refused to answer questions, however under US law they were compelled to provide written witness statements about the incident before being released without charge. The suspects were Irish males in their early 20s, and had fled to the US following the murder of Donohoe. It has been reported that the suspects in the US were on Green Card visas at this time.

In January 2014, a team of Garda detectives travelled to Sydney where one of the suspects, described as having "fled his home in the North just months" after the murder, gave a witness statement.

One of the suspects remained in Northern Ireland, where he later faced charges in unrelated cases.

In October 2016, the fiancée of one of the suspects was arrested in the United States on immigration offences.

=== 2017 US arrest ===
On Thursday, 18 May 2017, the prime murder suspect was detained in New York by U.S. Immigration and Customs Enforcement agents for violating immigration rules and was deported back to Ireland. Unlike extradition proceedings, deportations are implemented relatively quickly. The arrest was made as a result of a targeted investigation involving Irish and US law enforcement. US police were tracking the movements of the suspect on behalf of Gardai. The US Embassy in Dublin confirmed that there had been close cooperation involving Gardai and US authorities on the matter for "some time". Senior Garda officers described the development as highly significant.

The individual was arrested and brought before a judge in Ireland after he failed to turn up in court after he was convicted of charges in relation to a separate matter.

It was reported that a former associate of the man, who is currently living in Ireland, had been assisting investigating detectives with their inquiries.

=== 2018 Dublin, Dundalk arrests ===
On Sunday, 25 February 2018, a "man in his 20s" was arrested by the investigation team at 7.15 pm outside Wheatfield Prison after completing a sentence for road traffic offences, and brought to Dundalk Garda Station, where he was questioned for 3 days. This suspect's period of detention was extended by 3 days after gardai made an application to the District Court.

On Monday, 26 February 2018, a second man in his 50s was arrested in Dundalk and was detained at Balbriggan Garda Station. He was later released and a file was prepared for the DPP.

== Aaron Brady ==
On Sunday, 4 March 2018 at a special sitting of Dundalk District Court, 27-year-old Aaron Brady from New Road, Crossmaglen, County Armagh, was charged with the capital murder of Detective Garda Adrian Donohoe in the course of his duty. Detective Inspector Pat Marry said that when the charge was put to Mr Brady he said: "I strongly deny any involvement in the murder of Detective Garda Adrian Donohoe." He was remanded in custody to appear before Cloverhill District Court on 9 March.

There was a heavy Garda presence at the court where a large number of members of the public gathered and members of the US Department of Homeland Security were in attendance.

=== Involvement of US Homeland Security and ICE ===
Following the charging of Brady with murder, Acting Garda Commissioner Dónall Ó Cualáin and senior investigating Gardaí met with Alysa D. Erichs, Acting Deputy Executive Associate Director of Homeland Security Investigations (HSI) and her team of U.S. Immigration and Customs Enforcement agents at Dundalk Garda Station.

U.S. Immigration and Customs Enforcement's (ICE) Homeland Security Investigations (HSI) New York, HSI Attaché London and HSI Boston worked jointly with the Garda Síochána in relation to the international investigation. The investigation revealed that Brady was living in New York, entered the United States under the Visa Waiver Program but failed to leave upon expiration of the waiver, making him amenable for arrest and deportation from the United States for immigration violations. In May 2017 HSI New York, with assistance from ICE's Enforcement and Removal Operations (ERO) in New York, were able to arrest Brady by citing an expired visa. He remained in ERO custody until he was removed from the United States, flown to Dublin, and arrested by Garda Detectives upon arrival.

Alysa D. Erichs, Acting Deputy Executive Associate Director of Homeland Security Investigations said in a statement:

The United States will not be a safe haven for cop killers. When it comes to cop killers, there are no boundaries between us. The Garda is remaining true to their promise to the Donohoe family and to the Irish people. It is an honor for HSI to have worked alongside our Garda partners to investigate, locate, arrest and deport Aaron Brady to Ireland.

According to media reports, the rest of the suspected gang members were in the US, Australia and Northern Ireland and thousands of lines of inquiry were being pursued. Gardai have vowed to pursue those involved "to the ends of the earth".

=== 2020 capital murder trial ===
On 29 January 2020, the trial of Aaron Brady began in Dublin, with Mr Justice Michael White presiding over a jury composed of eight men and seven women. Brady pleaded not guilty to the capital murder of Detective Garda Adrian Donohoe on 25 January 2013 at Lordship Credit Union, and also the armed robbery of approximately €7,000 in cash and cheques during the same incident. Prosecution counsel Brendan Grehan SC outlined to the court how the highly organised robbery was carried out in only 58 seconds, when four young men wearing balaclavas jumped over a wall as a convoy of credit union workers cars attempted to leave the Lordship Credit Union car park. Two of them were armed, and they ran directly to the unmarked Garda car where Detective Garda Adrian Donohoe was killed instantly by a shotgun blast to the head. After smashing the windows of the credit union worker's cars to grab the money, the men fled in a getaway car that was deliberately blocking the entrance of the car park.

==== Prosecution Evidence - witnesses to the robbery ====
Detective Garda Eoin Conway testified to chief Prosecutor Lorcan Staines how he had taken crime scene photos at Lordship Credit Union a few hours after the robbery, and described how Detective Garda Adrian Donohoe's Sig Sauer P226 sidearm was still in its belt holster as his dead body lay beside the Toyota Avensis unmarked Garda car. Detective Garda Gareth Kenna presented CCTV footage of the robbery itself, which showed the unmarked Garda car arriving at the Lordship Credit Union at 9:25pm along with a Nissan Qashqai being driven by staff from the Cooley Credit Union. After a Lordship Credit Union worker exited the building and got into a Mazda car, all three vehicles then drove towards the car park exit so as to drive in convoy to Dundalk. Detective Kenna described to the jury how a vehicle suddenly blocked the exit and at the same time 2 men ran towards the Mazda. At the same time, another two men, one of whom was armed with a long barreled shotgun, ran towards the unmarked Garda car. CCTV footage showed how the individual with the shotgun then recoiled backwards several feet, appears to almost to hit the ground, then returns to the unmarked Garda car.

Retired Detective Joe Ryan, who was driving the unmarked Garda car on that night, testified how Detective Donohoe got out of the car to find out why the car park exit was being blocked, and at the same time Ryan spotted the armed man running towards their car. Ryan described how he realized they were being attacked and as he attempted to draw his holstered sidearm he heard a deafening bang and saw a blinding flash of light, followed by his car door being opened and a shotgun being aimed at him. He described the gunman with the shotgun as being in his early to mid-20s and wearing a dark tracksuit and balaclava mask, with a slim build and an estimated height of 6 feet. The second gunman was similarly dressed, armed with a semi-automatic handgun, and had an estimated height of five feet seven inches. The gunmen then ran to the car blocking the exit and drove off towards Dundalk, at which point Ryan called for emergency assistance for Detective Donohoe. According to Detective Garda Gareth Kenna, the total amount of time from when the vehicle stopped to block the exit of the credit union to when it drove off again was 58 seconds.

Lordship Credit Union worker Pat Bellew testified that when he got in his car he suddenly noticed a number of men jumping over the back wall of the credit union, one of whom smashed his car window and demanded money. Credit Union worker Bernadette McShane also told the court how she witnessed Detective Donohoe fall to the ground after hearing a loud bang, before some men smashed her car windows and demanded money from her. Credit Union worker Mary Hanlon testified how when she attempted to leave the car park on the night of the robbery, a Volkswagen Passat driven by a woman with blonde hair and a beanie hat suddenly drove across the entrance blocking her in, and at first she presumed the driver had stopped to take a phone call. Hanlon described how she then heard a series of loud bangs from behind her, followed by two armed men running past her passenger door and getting into the Passat before it drove off.

==== Prosecution Evidence - witnesses to the robbery aftermath ====
Stephen Toal testified to the court how he had been driving towards the Ballymascanlon roundabout soon after the robbery when he was suddenly overtaken at high speed by a Volkswagen Passat heading in the same direction. Frances Malone testified to the court how she was driving towards Lordship shortly after the robbery when she saw two cars driving towards her, in the direction of the Ballymascanlon roundabout, extremely fast with their full headlights on. As she was blinded by the headlights she could not describe the make or model of either car. Mervyn McBride testified how he has seen two cars driving at speed, one of which was a dark-coloured Volkswagen, on the Cortamlat Road near Newtownhamilton shortly after the time of the robbery. Alan McBride testified how he was working in a farm shed on the Chaleybeate Road near Tassagh around 9:45pm on the night of the robbery, and witnessed a dark colored BMW 5-series driving very fast towards Cumsons Road before returning at speed about 20 minutes later. Police Service of Northern Ireland officers testified to the court how a burned out Volkswagen Passat was subsequently found near the Cumsons Road in the early hours of 27 January 2013. Garda Finbar Gurhy testified that he was on duty at the Garda cordon around Lordship at 3am the morning after the robbery when he stopped a BMW driving along the Carlingford Road. Asking why he was in the area, the driver informed Garda Gurhy that he lived nearby and was returning to his house in Bellurgan. The passenger of the car was later identified as Aaron Brady.

Garda Inspector John Moroney testified that he was directing a team of about 30 Gradaí searching the area around Lordship Credit Union the morning after the robbery, when at 12:35pm he observed a BMW car driving towards Ballymacscanlon stopping at a checkpoint. Insp Moroney recognised the front seat passenger as Aaron Brady, as he was prosecuting him for a different criminal matter at Dundalk Circuit Court, and he decided to separate him and the driver of the car for questioning. According to Insp Moroney, Brady was calm and relaxed under questioning, and when he asked Brady to account for his movements the previous day he claimed to have visited the Superbites fast food restaurant in Crossmaglen with the driver of the car around 4:30pm, and then he was dropped off at his girlfriend's house near Culloville around 7pm. Brady said he stayed there until around 3am, when the driver of the BMW picked him up again and they both returned to his house in Bellurgan. Insp Moroney asserted that Brady claimed to have not heard about the shooting of Garda Adrian Donohoe until he woke up that morning, which the Inspector found strange as he would have had to enter the Garda cordon around Lordship the night before to return to his friend's house in Bellurgan. Insp Moroney then spoke to the driver of the BMW, who seemed to him to be nervous under questioning, and asked him to account for his whereabouts the previous evening. The BMW driver claimed he dropped Brady off at his house between 8pm and 9pm, and after calling into another friend in Crossmaglen for about an hour he picked up Brady again and dropped him of at his girlfriend's house sometime before 10pm. Insp Moroney agreed with the prosecution that there was a significant difference between the two accounts and that the timings didn't match up.

Forensic scientist Dr Edward Connolly testified how he examined evidence recovered from the crime scene at Lordship Credit Union. After eliminating members of the Garda and credit union workers, Dr Connolly discovered the complete DNA profiles of 3 unknown males from swabs taken from inside the driver side door of the unmarked Garda car, a piece of chewing gum and a discarded cigarette butt. Dr Connolly also examined items recovered from the burnt out Passat, however they were too badly damaged by smoke for proper forensic DNA analysis to be performed. The DNA profiles of the 3 unknown males were added to the Garda National DNA database system, however no matches were found. Dr Connolly confirmed that Aaron Brady's DNA profile did not match any of the samples from the Lordship Credit Union crime scene either.

==== Prosecution Evidence - events leading to the robbery ====
1 1:54am:BMW 5 Series gets fuel at Ballymacscanlon petrol station
2 3:00am:BMW 5 Series cruising the streets of Clogherhead
3 3:40am:BMW and Passat drive through Annagassan
4 4:51am:BMW arrives at Suspect A's home

Detective Garda Gareth Kenna asserted to the court that the burnt out car found near the Cumsons Road in County Armagh was the same Volkswagen Passat used as the getaway vehicle during the robbery at Lordship, and that inquiries confirmed that the burnt out Passat had been stolen from Clogherhead a couple of days before the incident at Lordship Credit Union. CCTV footage from the area showed a car similar to a BMW 5 Series slowly cruising the streets of Clogherhead at 3am on the morning of 27 January 2013, and the Passat was stolen shortly afterwards from the nearby Hillcrest estate. The court was also shown CCTV footage taken from the Ballymacscanlon petrol station at 1:54am on the same day, which showed a BMW 5 Series stopping for fuel. The BMW was being driven by a man referred to during the trial for legal reasons as "Suspect A". Prosecutor Lorcan Staines SC remarked to the court that the only logical reason for someone to fill their car with fuel in the middle of the night was they were about to go for a long drive.

The BMW was described by Detective Garda Gareth Kenna as being distinctive, as it had large multi-spoke alloy wheels, twin exhausts, a yellow number plate and a vinyl roof that was a different colour to the rest of the car. It also had its fog lights illuminated in the CCTV footage. The court was then shown a montage of CCTV clips from the same morning that showed a saloon-type car with its fog lights lit driving south to Monasterboice and Termonfeckin, and in some of the footage the different colour tone of the roof was clearly visible. The jury finally was shown CCTV footage recorded just after 3am that showed a car similar to a 5-Series BMW driving away from the Hillcrest estate in Clogherhead, and a car similar to a Passat driving north to Annagassan via backroads in convoy with what looked like Suspect A's BMW at around 3:40am. Finally, a car similar to a BMW was observed to arrive at Suspect A's home at 4:51am.

Gillian Burns, who worked at McCaughey's service station outside Castleblayney, testified that she knew Brady as a regular customer, and at 12:34pm on the day of the robbery at Lordship she saw Brady eating lunch at the service station's deli counter in the company of two other men (who were later identified as Suspect A and another man referred to during the trial for legal reasons as "Suspect B"). Expert witness Edward McGoey testified that he analyzed traffic between mobile phones attributed to Brady, Suspect A and Suspect B on the day of the robbery, and that there was no communication whatsoever from any of the phones between 8:30pm and 10:30pm on that day. McGoey added that there was a flurry of activity between the phones leading up to 8:30pm and another burst of activity from 10:37pm onwards. McGoey asserted the fact that the phones all went inactive and then reactivated over a very similar time period was "unusual", adding that while Brady had previously claimed to have barely known Suspect B phone records proved they had been in constant contact over the month of January 2013.

==== Prosecution Evidence - Brady "confessions" after the robbery ====
Molly Staunton testified via video link from New York City that she had previously shared an apartment with Brady in Woodlawn Heights, and that in July 2016 Brady told her that he "murdered a cop in Ireland" during a drunken rant. However, when defence counsel Fiona Murphy SC put it to Staunton that Brady had never admitted to her that he had actually shot Garda Detective Adrian Donohoe, and that he said he was in fear of arrest because An Garda Síochána themselves were accusing him of shooting a Garda, Staunton replied "That is correct". Despite defence objections Staunton was thereafter declared to be a hostile witness, and when being re-examined by prosecution counsel Brendan Grehan SC regarding discrepancies in her witness statement from August 2017 and her testimony in court, Staunton was suddenly interrupted by an unseen man in her New York apartment, who was heard by the court to say "Put a stop to it. You can stop it right now, no more testimony" before the live video feed was suddenly cut off without explanation. When the live feed resumed a short time later, Staunton clarified that the apartment was now empty and she could proceed with her testimony. Regarding what Brady said to her in the summer of 2016, Staunton said he was worried about the police raiding the apartment, as they were looking for him. As far as confessing to murdering a Garda, although he might have said "something along those lines" Staunton did not hear him actually admitting to it. Brendan Grehan SC then played a video recording of Staunton giving a sworn statement to two Garda detectives in New York on 29 August 2017, where Staunton states that Brady definitely admitted to murdering a cop. Staunton then stated to the court that after watching the video she wished to stand by her earlier statement and Brady had admitted to her that he had murdered a cop. When asked by Brady's defence team if the man in her apartment had cut the earlier video feed, Staunton claimed that she herself had closed the laptop.

Daniel Cahill also testified via video link from America, and described how Brady had told him on multiple occasions that he had shot a Garda officer during a "robbery gone wrong" while drinking in the Bronx pub he was a barman of. Cahill confirmed to the court that he had arrived in America on a 90 day visa in 2013, but stayed on to work as a bartender. Cahill clarified that he had since married an American citizen, but as of the summer of 2019 he had not filed any paperwork to apply for status to remain in the USA. Under cross examination by Brady's legal team, Cahill denied testifying against Brady under threat of being deported, claiming that he in fact wanted justice to be served for Adrian Donohoe's family instead. Cahill did however confirm that he was arrested by Homeland Security agents after they raided his house at 5am on the morning of 25 July 2019 and that he gave a statement to Garda officers at a police station in Yonkers that same day. Homeland Security Special Agent Mary Ann Wade also gave evidence via video link from America, where she confirmed her presence at Cahill's house on the day of his arrest. Special Agent Wade denied accusations from Brady's legal team that she told Cahill he could remain in the USA if he made a statement against Brady, however she refused to confirm or deny if Cahill was arrested by Homeland Security on 25 July 2019 on suspicion of overstaying his 90 day visa.

Inspector Mark Phillips confirmed to the court that a marijuana growing operation and a quantity of steroids were discovered at Cahill's home on the day of his arrest, however the local Assistant District Attorney had decided not to press criminal charges in relation to either of these discoveries. Immigration lawyer Kerry Bretz told the court via-video link from the US it was "very unusual" that no deportation proceedings were launched against Cahill, and that he had never heard of a visa overstayer being released and then instructed to file a visa application at a later date by Homeland Security before. Bretz attested that those who violate the terms of their 90-day visa have no right to appeal their case, and once detained by Homeland Security they are usually deported immediately via the next commercial flight to their country of origin, however Homeland Security agents do have discretion not to execute any deportation order. Bretz added that it was very odd that Homeland Security agents left Cahill at a local police precinct in the knowledge that he wasn't going to be prosecuted, rather than processing him for removal from the US.

==== Defence submissions ====
In what was described by some media outlets as an unusual decision, on 13 July 2020 Brady took to the stand and give evidence in his own defence, despite being under no obligation to rebut the prosecution's case against him. When asked directly by defence counsel Michael O'Higgins SC if he had murdered Detective Garda Adrian Donohoe in the car park of Lordship Credit Union, Brady denied killing him and also denied ever admitting to anyone else that he did. Brady also denied being involved in the robbery of Lordship Credit Union either, and claimed to have been engaged in diesel laundering at a yard outside Culloville at the time of the robbery. Brady likewise denied being involved in the theft of the alleged getaway car in Clogherhead. Brady claimed to have moved to America in April 2013 to escape adverse media attention, after a pixelated image taken from his Facebook page was splashed over the newspapers in articles relating to the robbery at Lordship. Brady testified that he at first worked for Suspect A at his business in Boston, however they had a falling out in February 2014 and they had not spoken since. Brady denied ever telling Daniel Cahill that he had shot Adrian Donohoe.

Brady testified that on the day of the robbery he was hanging out at Suspect A's house in Bellurgan, where they ate chicken curry and played video games. They both then picked up Suspect B at his house and drove him to Crossmaglen PSNI station so he could sign on at around 7:20pm. Afterwards they left Suspect B home again and Brady went to a house he was renting nearby, before he traveled to a yard on Concession Road to move cubes of diesel waste. About 90 minutes later Suspect A picked him up from the yard and dropped him off at his then girlfriend's house in Culloville around 11pm. Brady claimed he stayed with her until 3am that morning, when Suspect A again picked him up and they both returned to his house in Bellurgan, where he then fell asleep until the next morning. Brady admitted lying to Gardaí in the aftermath of the robbery at Lordship, and asking his then girlfriend to give a false statement also, regarding his movements on the night in question. However he asserted this was due to him being under curfew for the unlawful taking of a vehicle, the terms of which directed him to remain at his parents' house every night between 9pm and 7am.

Under cross examination by prosecution counsel Brendan Grehan SC, Brady admitted that he was in a car with Suspect A and Suspect B that drove past the Lordship Credit Union at 1:46pm on the afternoon of the robbery, however he denied they were checking its security arrangements. Grehan countered that it was nonsensical for Suspect A to drive past both the service station at Ballymascanlon and then his own house to make a 2 kilometer journey to the Bellurgan service station simply to purchase a couple of bottles of water. Although he admitted being present in Suspect A's house in Bellurgan five days before the robbery, when Gardaí were called to the house at 4:38am to investigate a report of intruders at the property, Brady denied they were actually testing Garda response times to arrive close to Lordship Credit Union. Brady likewise dismissed the suggestion that Suspect A's car was spotted in Clogherhead on the night the alleged getaway car was stolen, claiming that Suspect A earned over six figures a year from his business in American and would have no need to get involved in armed robberies or the theft of cars. When asked about mobile phone traffic between his phone and that of Suspect B on the night of the robbery, which included 8 missed calls just before 8:30pm and 2 short phone calls within a few minutes of each other around 10:50pm, Brady claimed to have no recollection of what they spoke about or the reason for so many earlier unsuccessful calls.

When challenged that his ex-girlfriend had given evidence about Brady telling her about Suspect A previously stealing a car, Brady claimed he could not remember that conversation but he would never had made such an accusation against Suspect A. Brady confirmed that he had asked his ex-girlfriend to lie to police about his whereabouts on the night of the robbery, and that he had also been untruthful when speaking to Inspector John Moroney at a checkpoint the morning after the robbery when asked about his movements the night before. However, Brady denied telling Inspector Moroney he was unaware that Detective Garda Adrian Donohoe had been shot the previous night, confirming that he first became aware of the incident when he saw it on Facebook at 10:45pm the night before at his then girlfriend's house, and he then seen a report about it on RTE News shortly after that. Brady claimed he wanted to challenge Inspector Moroney's testimony but his legal team did not act upon his instructions.

Regarding Molly Staunton's evidence, Brady claimed he was upset in their shared apartment on the night in question as two Garda had visited his wife's home in County Kerry and slandered his name. Brady also denied saying he murdered Detective Garda Adrian Donohoe or anyone else to her, asserting that the word "cop" wasn't in his vocabulary and he would never refer to a police man in those terms. In response to Daniel Cahill's evidence, Brady claimed that on St Patrick's Day 2015 he was assaulted by Cahill in relation to a personal dispute, after he broke into Brady's bedroom with a group of other men.

==== Closing statements ====
Addressing the jury at the conclusion of the trial, Lorcan Staines SC described Brady as a "skilled and practised liar", who had taken part in the robbery at Lordship to cover thousands of euros in compensation he was required to pay from an earlier criminal case, and who had made the conscious decision to open fire on the Gardaí who were escorting the credit union workers that night. Although the case against Brady was based on circumstantial evidence, Staines asserted that CCTV evidence around the theft of the Passat in Clogherhead, combined with the fact Brady's phone and the phones of other suspects in the robbery all went inactive at the same time around the time of the robbery, implied that an innocent occurrence of these events would be an extraordinary unlucky coincidence. Staines also highlighted how Brady and the other suspects also coincidently left Ireland shortly after the robbery, and how Molly Staunton, a witness with no motivation to lie, had given sworn testimony about Brady confessing to shooting a Garda. Staines summarised that individual events on their own could simply be a coincidence, however when all are stacked up together it was not reasonably possible for such a long series of strange events to innocently occur.

Brady's defence lawyer Michael O'Higgins SC dismissed testimony from Daniel Cahill and Molly Staunton as being unreliable, highlighting how Cahill was caught in possession of illegal drugs and therefore had a motive to co-operate with investigating officers, while Staunton's evidence could not be relied upon as she gave different accounts of the exact words spoken by Brady in their New York apartment. O'Higgins likewise criticized Special Agent Mary Ann Wade's refusal to answer his questions on the immigration status of various prosecution witnesses during her cross examination. O'Higgins SC also reminded the jury that the prosecution had to have proved their case beyond reasonable doubt that the gunman knew before he opened fire that Adrian Donohoe was a Garda acting in the course of his duty at the time in order to convict Brady of capital murder. O'Higgins highlighted how the robber shouted at Donohoe's partner to "give me the f***ing money", and asked if this was consistent with the raiders knowing in advance that they were Garadí on duty and not credit union workers instead. O'Higgins SC then highlighted how CCTV footage of the robbery shows the individual who fired the fatal shot staggering backwards several feet from the recoil of the shotgun, which implied it was an accidental discharge rather than a premeditated aimed shot, in which case an intention to kill was not proved and a verdict of manslaughter would therefore be more appropriate.

==== Brady found guilty of capital murder ====
On 10 August 2020, Brady was found guilty of the robbery of approximately €7,000 in cash and cheques outside Lordship Credit Union in County Louth in 2013 by unanimous decision after 13 hours of deliberations by the jury. Two days later, Brady was convicted of the capital murder of Detective Garda Adrian Donohoe during the same armed robbery at Lordship by a majority verdict of 11 to 1 after 20 hours of deliberations by the jury. Brady was thereafter sentenced to the mandatory term for capital murder of 40 years' imprisonment. Should he receive the maximum remission possible for good behaviour while in prison, he will be released no earlier than August 2050.

==== Sentencing ====
On Wednesday, 14 October 2020 Brady was sentenced to life in prison, to serve at least 40 years. He was also sentenced to 14 years for robbery, to run concurrently. Brady subsequently applied to appeal his conviction, with a trial date at the Court of Appeal set for October 2023.

=== Witness intimidation ===
Following Brady's murder conviction, detectives from the Serious Crime Review Team within the National Bureau of Criminal Investigation (GNBCI), arrested eight suspects as part of an investigation into alleged witness intimidation and perverting the course of justice during Brady's trial. During the murder trial, a video was taken on a mobile phone of a witness statement included in the book of evidence, and the footage posted on social media, with threats added to this video against the witness. Trial judge Mr Justice Michael White described this as "the most outrageous contempt of court" he had ever seen. It was reported that the prosecution was aware of "very serious" attempts to intimidate its key witnesses and efforts to collapse the murder trial. Reportedly as a result of witnesses being interfered with and intimidated, five witnesses did not testify at the Central Criminal Court. Aaron Brady was among those arrested on suspicion of witness intimidation.

==== Aaron Brady conviction ====
In April 2021, investigating detectives sent a file to the Director of Public Prosecutions recommending that Aaron Brady be charged in relation to the intimidation of witnesses during the Donohoe murder trial.

On 11 April 2024, Aaron Brady pleaded guilty at the Special Criminal Court to a charge of perverting the course of justice, in relation to the recording of a video of Ronan Flynn giving a witness statement to Gardaí (Detective Inspector Mark Phillips, Detective Sergeant Paul Gill, and Sergeant Padraig O'Reilly) about Brady admitting to shooting Detective Garda Donohoe on three separate occasions. This video was thereafter spread on social media during Brady's murder trial, with the presiding judge Mr Justice Michael White declaring it an attempt to intimidate Ronan Flynn along with other potential witnesses. After pleading guilty, Brady applied to have reporting restrictions imposed in case the fact he pleaded guilty would prejudice any future re-trial in the event his murder conviction (in which he maintains his innocence) was overturned as a result of any ongoing appeals. However, the court rejected his request as the Irish Constitution dictated that justice must be administered in public, and Brady's legal team had not satisfied the court that his circumstances made him an exception to this rule.

==== Dean Byrne conviction ====
On 11 April 2024, Dean Byrne pleaded not guilty at the Special Criminal Court to a charge of conspiring to pervert the course of justice, in relation to efforts to persuade Daniel Cahill not to give evidence against Aaron Brady at his trial. Prosecution counsel Lorcan Staines outlined to the court a number of incriminating text and audio messages recovered from a mobile phone discovered in Byrne's cell in Mountjoy Prison which mentioned Daniel Cahill. Detective Inspector Mark Phillips later told the court that Ronan Flynn (who had given a witness statement against Brady in 2017) contacted him in July 2019 to complain he was receiving threatening messages and had been approached by an associate of Brady in New York City in relation to him giving evidence. Inspector Phillips further testified that Daniel Cahill had also been approached in a similar manner regarding him appearing as a witness for the prosecution.

On 17 April 2024, Dean Byrne made a number of admissions via his legal team under Section 22 of the Criminal Justice Act (1984), specifically that:

- the search of his cell in Mountjoy prison by Gardai was lawful
- the seizure of a mobile phone during that search was lawful
- Byrne's arrest in relation to conspiring to pervert the course of justice was lawful
- the search warrants used by Gardai were lawfully obtained and executed
- all evidence gathered was lawfully retained and preserved
- Byrne had access to and had used the mobile phone seized by Gardai
- the mobile phone contained photographs of witness statements provided to Gardai by Daniel Cahill
- Byrne forwarded the witness statements photographs to a relative of Daniel Cahill

Prosecution counsel Lorcan Staines described the admissions as significant, and that they would shorten the length of the trial dramatically (from an estimated 14 weeks to around 3 weeks).

On 30 April 2024, Mountjoy prison officer David Sheridan described to the court how a smartphone was discovered hidden under the sink of Dean Byrne's cell during a search. When examined, the phone contained messages between a Facebook account under the name Dean Byrne and the account of a relative of Daniel Cahill. Gardai later obtained a court order to retrieve records directly from Facebook of all conversations between the two accounts. These messages were then outlined in court, which referred to Daniel Cahill agreeing to give evidence against Aaron Brady in court and included pictures of a witness statement given by Cahill to Irish authorities in a New York City police station in 2019.

Detective Sergeant Peter Woods testified to the court that Dean Byrne was arrested in Mountjoy prison on 8 October 2020, and then brought to Mountjoy garda station for interrogation. Byrne denied ownership of the phone discovered in his cell, instead insisting it belonged to the inmate who previously lived there. Byrne also denied all allegations put to him by Gardai regarding incriminating messages discovered on the phone.

On 1 May 2024, defence lawyer Padraig Dwyer made an application to the court to dismiss all charges against his client Dean Byrne, claiming the charges against him were unclear and there was a complete lack of evidence of wrongdoing. Dwyer argued that Byrne was charged with attempting to "persuade" a witness not to give evidence, which was completely different from threatening them and was also not unlawful. Simultaneously, the authorities had not presented any evidence on who was doing the "persuasion" or how they were doing it, therefore they could not prove any criminal act had occurred. Prosecution lawyer Lorcan Staines countered that any sort of outside intervention in the judicial process is regarded as an intentional act, which perverts with the course of justice and is thus a criminal offense.

On 7 May 2024, presiding judge Mr Justice Burns rejected the prosecution's assertion that all attempts to persuade a witness not to give evidence amounted to a criminal offense, as there were in fact some limited circumstances where a person could lawfully try to persuade a witness not to give evidence in a trial. However, Mr Justice Burns concurrently refused an application from the defence to dismiss charges against Dean Byrne, stating that "persuasion" could cause the course of justice to be perverted. The court also determined that, for the burden of proof to be met in the current case, the prosecution did not have to produce any evidence that the accused used the threat of force or corrupt inducements in attempting to influence a witness not to give evidence.

On 14 June 2024, Dean Byrne was found guilty of conspiring with Aaron Brady to pervert the course of justice, by attempting to persuade Daniel Cahill not to give evidence at Brady's capital murder trial in 2020. Byrne was then remanded in custody ahead of sentencing hearings scheduled to begin on 15 July 2024.

==== Brady & Byrne Sentencing ====
On 29 July 2024, Aaron Brady was sentenced to an additional 3 years in prison for attempting to pervert the course of justice, while Dean Byrne was sentenced to 2 years in prison for conspiring with Brady to pervert the course of justice. On 31 July 2026, the Court of Appeal re-sentenced Brady to 5 years detention after ruling the original penalty was too lenient.

=== Failed Appeal of murder conviction ===
The Court of Appeal, comprising Mr Justice Edwards, Ms Justice Isobel Kennedy and Ms Justice Tara Burns, began to hear Brady's legal arguments to overturn his conviction on 4 October 2023. Michael O'Higgins SC, representing Brady, submitted 47 grounds of appeal to the court, including:

- the fact the original trial took place during the COVID lockdown negatively affected jury deliberations
- Homeland Security Special Agents Mary Anne Wade and Matt Katske were both instructed not to disclose the immigration status of relevant prosecution witnesses in the case during their own cross-examination by Brady's legal team
- defence lawyers were not allowed to submit into evidence and put before the jury a covert audio recording between Homeland Security Special Agent Matt Katske and James Flynn (the man referred to during the trial for legal reasons as "Suspect A") at Belfast Airport in 2017, where the agent offered to halt American deportation proceedings against Flynn's brother in return for help in identifying persons who could be persuaded to testify as prosecution witnesses against Aaron Brady
- the trial judge erred in permitting the prosecution to treat Molly Staunton as a hostile witness in circumstances where her position had changed following cross-examination by the defence
- the trial judge had erred in giving the jury a summary of the video evidence from prosecution witness Molly Staunton that they did not see first-hand (due to interruptions by an unknown person in the New York City apartment it was being live-streamed from)
- a US police report regarding the discovery of steroids at the New York home of prosecution witness Daniel Cahill during his arrest by Homeland Security was not disclosed to defence lawyers until after his cross-examination, thus depriving them of an opportunity to question him effectively in front of the jury
- the trial judge erred in failing to withdraw the Capital Murder charge from the consideration of the jury due to insufficiency of evidence that the individual who fired the shotgun knew in advance that Adrian Donohoe was a member of An Garda Síochána (as he was dressed in plain clothes and sitting in an unmarked Garda car)

"I wanna know people who know Aaron Brady has admitted doing it and then I can… offer things once I have that… till I have that I can't offer anything… I can't find anything wrong with (James Flynn's brother) immigration paperwork…which believe me there are things wrong with his immigration paperwork… he's not getting removed but there is problems, so if nobody comes to say (James Flynn's brother) is willing to help I can't… he's going to be removed… My goal is Aaron Brady… Aaron Brady goes away. You'll probably never see me again."

— Excerpt of covert audio recording between Homeland Security Special Agent Matt Katske and James Flynn at Belfast Airport (June 2017)

On 11 July 2024, the Court of Appeal dismissed Brady's application to overturn his murder conviction all 47 grounds of his appeal, ruling that amongst other things:

- the original trial judge made the correct decision in allowing the trial to proceed during the Covid lockdown
- allowing witnesses give evidence via video link during the pandemic was justified also.
- the integrity of the trial was not corrupted when an unknown person interrupted a live-streamed witness testimony
- the directions of the trial judge to the jury mitigated any risk of an unfair trial.
- the submission into evidence of a private conversation between Brady and his ex-girlfriend (regarding his alleged whereabouts on the night of the robbery at Lordship) was lawful
- admitting into evidence a phone conversation between Brady and his ex-girlfriend where he admitted to previously stealing a jeep with Jimmy Flynn and Benny Treanor (the man referred to during the trial for legal reasons as "Suspect B") was also lawful
- the original trial judge was correct in his decision not to discharge the jury after the cross examination of Brady's previous lawyer, and that the questions put to him were not prejudicial to a fair trial either
- the covert recording of Special Agent Katzke was correctly not put before the jury, as the defence wanted to use it in the questioning of Detective Inspector Marry regarding inducements allegedly being offered to anyone who would testify against Brady, and the rules of evidence in Irish criminal proceedings mandated that a witness can only be asked questions in relation to facts of which they have direct knowledge of
- the trial judge was also correct in not allowing Brady's legal team to cross-examine Special Agent Katzke regarding the covert recording, as the prosecution alleged that it was in fact only a partial recording of the entire conversation and that James Flynn was not available to be cross-examined by the prosecution
- CCTV footage was correctly admitted as evidence and did not breach Brady's right to privacy under the Constitution of Ireland
- data extracted from mobile phones, that was then used in an attempt to identify users of other phones, was correctly determined to be admissible as evidence
- Brady was legally deported from America and was not subjected to a "de facto extradition", and was therefore not entitled to any extra legal protections
- the trial judge was correct in rejecting the defence's application to withdraw the Capital Murder charge, as the fact the robbery gang had over 2 minutes to observe the Lordship Credit Union car park before the two men with firearms ran directly to the Garda car implied that they knew Joe Ryan and Adrian Donohoe were both armed Gardaí on cash escort duty

In August 2024, Brady's legal team submitted an application to appeal his murder conviction at the Supreme Court of Ireland. On 21 November 2024, it was announced the Supreme Court had rejected his request. This rebuttal by the court of final appeal in Ireland signified that Brady had exhausted all legal avenues to appeal his conviction, and thus as a result he would have to serve his original life sentence, with a minimum term of 40 years, for the capital murder of Detective Garda Adrian Donohoe in 2013.

== Jimmy Flynn and Brendan Treanor ==
On 15 July 2021, 33-year-old Brendan Treanor was brought before Dundalk District Court and charged with the robbery of €7,000 in cash and cheques at the Lordship Credit Union in Bellurgan on 25 January 2013 and conspiracy to commit burglaries (with the intention of stealing the keys of the households' cars) between 11 September 2012 and 23 January 2013. He was then remanded in custody to Cloverhill Prison.

Flynn was arrested in England in July 2021 on foot of an Irish extradition request. A London court ordered his extradition in April 2022, and on 29 July 2022 he was returned to Ireland, charged with the same offences as Treanor and remanded in custody.

Both Jimmy Flynn and Brendan Treanor later had their cases transferred to the Special Criminal Court to face joint trial together, scheduled to begin in January 2023.

=== 2023 Special Criminal Court trial ===
On 1 February 2023, the trial of James Flynn and Brendan Treanor began at the non-jury Special Criminal Court in Dublin, with Mr Justice Tony Hunt presiding along with Judge Sarah Berkeley and Judge Alan Mitchell.

==== Opening statements ====
Lorcan Staines, acting on behalf of the Director of Public Prosecutions, outlined how circumstantial evidence (such as cell site analysis and CCTV evidence regarding the movements of specific cars) would be presented to the court with the intention of proving a how a pattern of individual burglaries could be linked to both of the accused.

==== Witness evidence ====
On 14 March 2023, the ex-girlfriend of Brendan Treanor gave evidence of having spoken to him at their house in Tullydonnell on the night of the robbery at around 9:45 pm, when she asked him what food he wanted from a local takeaway she was going to visit. The court then viewed CCTV from a fast food restaurant in Crossmaglen, showing her entering the premises and ordering food at 10:05 pm and leaving at 10:17 pm. She then drove the ten-minute journey home, where Treanor was trying to dry out his phone after dropping it into the bath. About ten minutes after returning from the takeaway, the Police Service of Northern Ireland called to their address to do a bail check on Treanor regarding a separate matter.

On 28 March 2023, the ex-housemate of Aaron Brady was treated as a hostile witness while being cross-examined by the prosecution. The witness explained how he made an initial statement to Gardai in 2013 confirming that Brady and Jimmy Flynn were both in his house between 9.15 pm and 10.45 pm on the night of the robbery. However, after what he claimed was harassment on a number of occasions to change his statement and allegations that a garda had threatened him with jail a number of times, he subsequently made a second statement to gardai in 2017 asking to withdraw his original statement and his new position was that he did not see Brady or Flynn "at all" on the night of 25 January 2013.

==== Circumstantial evidence ====
On 3 May 2023, Justice Tony Hunt ruled that pictures of a tattoo on Brendan Treanor's back be admitted into evidence, despite protests from defense lawyers that it was irrelevant to the facts and should not form part of the prosecution case. SC Grehan told the court that the prosecution relies on the tattoo as a piece of circumstantial evidence, as it was "almost a glorification" of what happened during the robbery at Lordship. The tattoo consisted of a woman wearing a balaclava and several men dressed as 1950s-style gangsters on either side of a BMW X5 car, surrounded by images of banknotes, bullets and a knuckle duster. The owner of the tattoo parlor who performed the work had earlier testified that in 2018, Treanor had asked him to cover up an existing tattoo of a woman's name (possibly of his ex-girlfriend) on his back, and that much of the imagery on Mr Treanor's back was popular with many other clients at the time and was sourced from the internet rather than originating from a specific request from Treanor himself.

==== Closing statements ====
On 16 May 2023, Lorcan Staines SC completed his lengthy closing speech to the court by summarizing how CCTV footage, matched with messages and calls between various phones, showed that Jimmy Flynn and Aaron Brady travelled late at night to Clogherhead on the same day a Volkswagen Passat (allegedly the getaway car from the robbery) was stolen in a creeper burglary. Staines also described how the phones of five people allegedly involved in the robbery, including Mr Flynn and Mr Treanor, went dead at the same time shortly before the robbery, as well as outlining how mobile phone cell-site data and CCTV from outside Flynn's house proved links between Treanor, Flynn, Brady and numerous car thefts in 2012 and 2013. Allegations that Garda response times were tested four days before the robbery when Gardai were called to Jimmy Flynn's home outside Lordship in response to a suspected burglary in progress, along with the fact that radio scanners and walkie-talkies were discovered in Flynn's house during a later search, were also flagged as evidence of his involvement in the robbery of Lordship Credit Union.

Sean Guerin SC, on behalf of Brendan Treanor, said there was no evidence at all that his client left his home on the evening of the robbery. Also, as CCTV evidence proved that the robbers had waited in a muddy field behind the credit union in wet weather for nearly 1 hour before jumping the wall at 9:30 pm, it would be logical that they would be soaking wet and wearing muddy clothes afterwards. However, according to the sworn testimony of the ex-girlfriend of Treanor, when she spoke to him at their house at 9:45 pm on the night in question he was dressed normally and did not have wet hair. Since the credit union was exactly a 15-minute drive away from their house, Guerin asserted that it was highly unlikely that Treanor would be able to make it home in time to get cleaned up / dried off and dispose of dirty clothing within the timeframe allowed. He also raised the evidence of a witness who had seen a Volkswagen Passat (possibly the getaway vehicle) about five minutes after the robbery, driving at high speed the wrong way around the Ballymascanlon roundabout near Lordship and onto the M1 motorway (Junction 18) heading south towards Dublin, which is in the opposite direction of Treanor's home.

Bernard Condon SC, on behalf of Jimmy Flynn, said there was no evidence whatsoever that his client was at the Lordship Credit Union during the robbery and asserted that prosecution had not proven his client's involvement in the theft of the Volkswagen Passat, allegedly used in the robbery, from Clogherhead a few days earlier. CCTV footage of a BMW travelling north from Clogherhead was dismissed as being "deeply problematic" by highlighting how one 10 minute journey was timed at 6 minutes according to the timestamp while a 21-minute journey was timed at 27 minutes. Condon also highlighted the sworn evidence of a local farmer who saw two cars travelling towards the burn site on the night of the robbery, one of which was a BMW with blue headlights. As Flynn's car did not have similar coloured headlights, it could not have been his car and therefore the prosecution had failed to link him to the burn site of the alleged getaway vehicle either. He also dismissed the prosecution's theory of Flynn testing police response times, as gardai were highly unlikely to treat a report of intruders at a yard with the same urgency as an armed robbery on a financial institution where shots were fired resulting in death or serious injury.

At the end of proceedings, Mr Justice Tony Hunt said the three judges of the non-jury court would require some time to consider their judgments, as there was a considerable amount of evidence to evaluate and that the court was also obliged to provide detailed reasons for its verdicts. Justice Hunt then indicated that the court hoped to deliver their verdicts by mid-September 2023 at the latest.

==== 2023 verdicts ====
On 11 September 2023, the court found Flynn guilty of conspiring with Brady and others to break into a house in Clogherhead to steal the keys of a Volkswagen Passat, which the prosecution said was later used as the getaway car in the credit union robbery. The court was satisfied that Flynn's BMW 5 Series, which had a distinctive wraparound roof, was seen on CCTV driving in convoy with the stolen car. Flynn was acquitted of the robbery of €7,000 at the credit union, as there was no evidence placing him at the scene. He was remanded in custody until 13 November 2023.

Brendan Treanor was found not guilty of both charges, as there was no evidence presented to the court that he was present in Clogherhead on the night the getaway car was stolen and the prosecution had not rebutted the reasonable possibility that he was at home at the time of the credit union robbery in Lordship. However, Mr Justice Hunt stated there was "clear evidence that establishes that Treanor is a member of a criminal gang along with others and was involved before during and after the robbery", but that charges of membership of a criminal gang had not been brought before the court.

==== Sentencing of Flynn ====
On 21 December 2023, James Flynn was sentenced at the Special Criminal Court to 8 years in prison for conspiracy to burgle a house to steal the keys of the car allegedly used as the getaway vehicle during the armed robbery of Lordship Credit Union in 2013.

==== Flynn's conviction overturned ====
On 10 March 2025, the Court of Appeal overturned Flynn's conviction for conspiring to steal the keys of a Volkswagen Passat in Clogherhead that was allegedly used as the getaway vehicle in the armed robbery of Lordship Credit Union in 2013. The court ruled that the decision to amend the indictment against Flynn, from an original charge of conspiring to steal multiple cars from various locations, only after his trial had finished was a breach of his constitutional rights, as it deprived him of the opportunity to make legal arguments against it or enter a plea. A hearing was then set for 18 March 2025 to decide if Flynn should face a retrial.

On 10 April 2025, the Court of Appeal ordered that Flynn be retried on the indictment as originally charged. On 29 April 2025, the Special Criminal Court refused him bail as a flight risk and set the retrial for 9 February 2026. Flynn appealed to the Supreme Court, which ruled on 25 March 2026 that the Court of Appeal had no power to order a retrial on the original charge. A retrial could only be ordered for the offence of which he had been convicted, conspiracy to burgle a house in Clogherhead on 22–23 January 2013 to steal car keys, and the court listed a further hearing on whether that retrial should take place. In October 2026, the Supreme Court ordered that Flynn be retried on that charge.

== See also ==
- List of Gardaí killed in the line of duty
