= List of major crimes in Ireland =

A number of major crimes in Ireland have attained notability or notoriety due to those involved or their lasting effects on society or legislation. As of 2019, the Republic of Ireland had the 11th lowest homicide rate in Europe and the 23rd lowest rate globally.

== 19th century ==
=== 1880s ===
| Date | Name | Deaths | Location | Summary |
|---|---|---|---|---|
| 1882 | Lough Mask Murders | 2 | Lough Mask, County Galway | In January 1882, Joseph Huddy (a bailiff for the local landlord) and his grandson John Huddy were reputedly murdered and their bodies concealed in Lough Mask. |
| 1882 | Maamtrasna murders | 5 | Maamtrasna, County Galway | Five members of the family of John Joyce were hacked to death on the night of 18 August 1882. The trial of ten local men was highly controversial; three were hanged. Some of those executed were later posthumously pardoned. |

== 20th century ==
=== 1920s ===
| Date | Name | Deaths | Location | Summary |
|---|---|---|---|---|
| 1925 | Killing of Lizzie O'Neill | 1 | Ticknock, County Dublin | Lizzie O'Neill, a sex worker, was fatally shot in Ticknock, County Dublin. A doctor from County Wicklow and a Garda Superintendent were put on trial for their alleged role in her death. Both were acquitted. |
| 1929 | The Missing Postman of Stradbally | 1 | Stradbally, County Waterford | Larry Griffin, a 55-year-old postman, disappeared without trace after delivering the mail on Christmas Day. It was widely believed that he had died during a fight in the local pub, and that his body was hidden to protect the positions of the local people involved. |

=== 1940s ===
| Date | Name | Deaths | Location | Summary |
|---|---|---|---|---|
| 1940 | Murder of Moll McCarthy | 1 | New Inn, County Tipperary | Mary McCarthy, known as Moll Carthy, was shot dead near New Inn in County Tipperary in Ireland. Henry "Harry" Gleeson was convicted of her murder and executed, but granted a posthumous pardon in 2015. |

=== 1950s ===
| Date | Name | Deaths | Location | Summary |
|---|---|---|---|---|
| 1954 | Murder of Catherine Cooper | 1 | Limerick, Ireland | Catherine Cooper, a 65-year-old nurse, was murdered by Michael Manning while working at Barrington's Hospital. Manning was later tried and convicted of her murder becoming the last person to be hanged in the Republic of Ireland. |

=== 1960s ===
| Date | Name | Deaths | Location | Summary |
|---|---|---|---|---|
| 1964 | Murder of George Applebe | 1 | County Cork, Ireland | Jimmy Ennis was released from prison after serving a four-year jail term for a brutal hatchet attack against a woman named Mary Reynolds, which left her severely brain damaged. Two days after his release, Ennis broke into the house of George Applebe, a farmer who had previously employed Ennis. During the burglary, Ennis was disturbed by Applebe and his wife, both of whom he bludgeoned with an iron bar. George Applebe died of his injuries. Ennis later turned himself in and was imprisoned in late 1964. Ennis never applied for parole, and remained in prison until at least 2016, becoming one of Ireland's longest serving prisoners. |

=== 1970s ===
| Date | Name | Deaths | Location | Summary |
|---|---|---|---|---|
| 1971 | Murders of Una Lynskey and Martin Kerrigan | 2 | Ratoath, County Meath | Una Lynskey disappeared on 12 October 1971, while walking the short distance from the bus stop to her rural home. Her body was found two months later. Shortly after, Martin Kerrigan's body was found close to the same site. |
| 1973 | Murder of Sarah Frances Fitzpatrick | 1 | Ballinasloe, County Galway | Walking home from the pub and looking for easy money, 18 year-old John Joseph Kenny breaks into the home of 79 year-old Sarah Frances Fitzpatrick, not expecting her to be home. When he wakes her, he panics and bludgeons the elderly woman to death with a candlestick. Sentenced to life, he is one of Ireland's longest serving inmates. |
| 1974 | Murder of Billy Fox | 1 | Clones, County Monaghan | Seanad member and former Teachta Dála Billy Fox was shot dead by members of the Provisional IRA during a raid on his girlfriend's farmhouse. Fox was the first member of the Oireachtas to be killed since Kevin O'Higgins was killed by the anti-Treaty Irish Republican Army in 1927. |
| 1974 | Dublin and Monaghan bombings | 33 | Dublin and Monaghan | The Dublin and Monaghan bombings of 17 May 1974 were a series of car bombings in Dublin and Monaghan in Ireland. The attacks killed 33 civilians and wounded almost 300 – the highest number of casualties in any one day during the conflict known as the Troubles. 26 people were murdered in Dublin, 7 in Monaghan. A loyalist paramilitary group, the Ulster Volunteer Force (UVF) conspiring with the British Army, claimed responsibility for the bombings in 1993. No one has ever been charged with the attacks. |
| 1975 | Death of Michael J. Reynolds | 1 | Raheny, Dublin | Garda Michael J. Reynolds pursued armed raiders into St. Anne's Park who had stolen £7,000. He managed to wrestle one of them to the ground, prompting the other to shoot Reynolds through the head. He was posthumously awarded the Scott Medal for bravery. |
| 1976 | Murders of Elizabeth Plunkett and Mary Duffy | 2 | County Wicklow and County Mayo | Two English drifters, John Shaw and Geoffrey Evans, arrive in Ireland with the intention to rape and murder one woman a week. Their first victim was Elizabeth Plunkett, a 23-year-old woman who was raped by both men before Shaw choked her to death with a shirt sleeve on Evans' orders. The pair then attacked 24 year-old chef Mary Duffy, who Shaw smothered with a cushion after she was raped by both men. Both were later convicted and became Ireland's longest serving prisoners; Evans died at age 69 in 2012. |
| 1977 | Disappearance of Mary Boyle | 1 | Ballyshannon, County Donegal | 6 year-old Mary Boyle was abducted and is presumed murdered. Her body was never recovered and the perpetrator remains uncaught. |
| 1979 | Murder of Louis Mountbatten, 1st Earl Mountbatten of Burma, Nicholas Knatchbull, Paul Maxwell & Doreen Knatchbull, Baroness Brabourne | 4 | Mullaghmore, County Sligo | Lord Mountbatten of Burma, a British statesman and naval officer, an uncle of Prince Philip, Duke of Edinburgh, and second cousin once-removed to Queen Elizabeth II, was assassinated by the Provisional IRA. Nicholas Knatchbull, his elder daughter's 14 year-old son; and Paul Maxwell, a 15-year-old crew member from Enniskillen, were killed in the blast. Doreen Knatchbull, the Dowager Lady Brabourne was seriously injured in the explosion and died from her injuries the following day. Thomas McMahon was convicted of murder but was later released as part of the Good Friday Agreement. |

=== 1980s ===
| Date | Name | Deaths | Location | Summary |
|---|---|---|---|---|
| 1980 | Killing of Seamus Quaid | 1 | Ballyconnick, County Wexford | Two Gardaí, Seamus Quaid and Donal Lyttleton, attempt to detain an IRA fugitive, Peter Rogers, who opened fire in return. Quaid was shot and killed. |
| 1981 | Stardust fire | 48 | Dublin | A fire at the Stardust nightclub in Dublin, caused by an electrical fault, results in the deaths of 48 people. While an earlier inquest suggested that the fire was the result of arson, this ruling was dismissed in 2009. The jury in a 2024 inquest, at Dublin City Coroner's Court, returned a verdict of "unlawful killing". |
| 1982 | Murder of Patrick Gerard Reynolds | 1 | Tallaght, Dublin | Gardaí responding to an anonymous tip regarding suspicious activity come across five armed men counting their loot from a bank robbery. Two of the men attempt to flee, and as they run down the stairs come face-to-face with 23 year-old Patrick Gerard Reynolds, an unarmed Garda. He turns to retreat back down the stairs, but is shot in the back and dies. |
| 1982 | Murders of Bridie Gargan and Dónal Dunne | 2 | Phoenix Park, Ireland | Malcolm Edward MacArthur bludgeoned nurse Bridie Gargan to death while she was sunbathing in the Phoenix Park then stole her car. Three days later, he shot and killed farmer Dónal Dunne with his own shotgun before eventually being apprehended at the residence of then-Attorney General Patrick Connolly, where MacArthur had been staying as a houseguest for some time. The incident became the subject of the phrase GUBU. |
| 1982 | Murder of Charles Self | 1 | Monkstown, Dublin | Charles Self, a gay man from England who worked as a set designer for RTÉ, was fatally stabbed fourteen times and slashed three times across the throat in his own home. The murder remains unsolved. |
| 1982 | Murder of Declan Flynn | 1 | Fairview, Dublin | Declan Flynn, a 31-year-old gay man, was ambushed in Fairview Park and beaten to death in a homophobic attack. Five men were charged with the murder; Tony Maher, Robert Alan Armstrong, Patrick Kavanagh, Colm Donovan, and a 14-year-old who could not be named for legal reasons. All five walked free, though Armstrong would later be jailed in 1987 for the rape of a pregnant woman. The case sparked widespread protests and is seen to be, along with the murder of Charles Self, the catalyst for the Gay Rights Movement in Ireland. |
| 1983 | Kidnap of Shergar (horse) | — | Ballymany Stud, County Kildare | Shergar, a champion racehorse, is stolen by armed men and ransomed for £2 million. It was not paid and the horse never recovered. |
| 1985 | Shooting of Patrick Joseph Morrissey | 1 | Tallanstown, County Louth | While chasing Michael McHugh and Noel Callaghan, two INLA members who had stolen £25,000 from the Labour Exchange in Ardee, Garda sergeant Patrick Joseph Morrissey is fatally shot. He was post-posthumously awarded the Scott Medal for bravery. |
| 1985 | Death of Father Niall Molloy | 1 | Clara, County Offaly | On the night of 8 July, Father Niall Molloy, the parish priest of Castlecoote in Roscommon, was found beaten to death in the home of Richard and Therese Flynn. Richard Flynn was tried for his murder but acquitted, and to date the crime remains unsolved. |
| 1986 | The Russborough House art robbery | — | County Wicklow, Ireland | Martin Cahill and his gang steal 18 paintings valued at $30,000,000 from the Russborough House in May 1986. |
| 1986 | Disappearance of Philip Cairns | 1 | Rathfarnham, Dublin, Ireland | 13 year-old schoolboy Philip Cairns vanishes in broad daylight while walking back to school after lunch. |

=== 1990s ===
| Date | Name | Deaths | Location | Summary |
|---|---|---|---|---|
| 1992 | Michael Bambrick Murders | 2 | Dublin's south innercity | In September 1991, cross-dressing sexual sadist Michael Bambrick suffocates his common-law wife Patricia McGauley following a bondage session. Over the following days, he dismembered her corpse and buried it in an illegal dump. In July of the following year, he meets Mary Cummins in a bar and lures her back to his home where he strangles her before cutting up and dumping her body. In 1995, following an arrest for an unrelated firearms offence, Bambrick finally confesses to the two killings, and ultimately served 13 years for manslaughter, being released in 2009. |
| 1994 | Murder of Martin Cahill | 1 | Dublin, Ireland | Irish crime boss Martin Cahill, nicknamed The General, is fatally shot multiple times by an unidentified gunman while sitting in his car. The assassination is believed to have been ordered by the Provisional IRA. |
| 1995 | Murder of Marilyn Rynn | 1 | Blanchardstown, Dublin | Civil servant Marilyn Rynn disappears while walking home an office Christmas party. In the early days of the new year, her body is found in a local park; raped and strangled. In a historic case, the first ever use of DNA in a criminal prosecution sees local man David Lawler convicted of the random killing. Lawler is a cousin to notorious Irish sex attacker Larry Murphy. |
| 1996 | Murder of Tom Nevin | 1 | Brittas Bay, County Wicklow | Tom Nevin, owner of Jack White's Inn in County Wicklow, was fatally shot dead on 19 March 1996. His wife, Catherine Nevin, was convicted of the murder. |
| 1996 | Murder of Jerry McCabe | 1 | Adare, County Limerick, Ireland | Detective Garda Jerry McCabe was fatally shot by members of the Provisional IRA during an attempted robbery of a post office van. Pearse McAuley from Strabane and three County Limerick men – Jeremiah Sheehy, Michael O'Neill and Kevin Walsh – were convicted by the non-jury Special Criminal Court of manslaughter. |
| 1996 | Murder of Sinéad Kelly | 1 | Dublin, Ireland | The body of Dublin prostitute Sinéad Kelly is found on the banks of the canal. It is believed she was stabbed to death by heroin dealers after she did not pay up for drugs. Together with the death of Belinda Pereira (an English woman of Sri Lankan descent who worked as a prostitute in Dublin and was found beaten to death in her apartment), Kelly's death raised questions about the Criminal Law (Sexual Offences) Act of 1993. |
| 1996 | Murder of Veronica Guerin | 1 | Naas Dual Carriageway, outside Dublin, Ireland | Veronica Guerin, a journalist investigating Irish drug traffickers, was shot five times and killed by two gunmen on a motorcycle while stopped at an intersection outside Dublin. A massive investigation later resulted in the arrest of over 150 suspects before the eventual extradition of drug trafficker Brian Meehan who was later convicted and sentenced to life imprisonment. |
| 1996 | Murder of Sophie Toscan du Plantier | 1 | Cork, Ireland | French film producer Sophie Toscan du Plantier is found beaten to death outside of her holiday home in Cork. Journalist Ian Bailey has been arrested twice in connection to the case, but has never been charged and the crime officially remains unsolved. |
| 1997 | Grangegorman killings | 2 | Grangegorman, Dublin | Sylvia Shields and Mary Callinan, patients of St. Brendan's Psychiatric Hospital, were found dead with multiple stab wounds to their faces and necks. Dean Lyons confesses to the double murder but is later revealed to be an attention-hungry compulsive liar. Mark Nash, a man who had committed another double murder (that of Carl and Catherine Doyle three months after the killings at Grangegorman) is identified as another suspect, and is found guilty and sentenced to life in 2015 for the crime. Dean Lyons, exonerated, died of a heroin overdose in 2000. |
| 1999 | Murder of Raonaid Murray | 1 | Dún Laoghaire, Ireland | Raonaid Murray, a 17-year-old girl from South Dublin, was stabbed to death in a laneway 50 yards from her home. |
| 1999 | Attack on Robert Drake | — | Sligo, Ireland | Two men, Glen Mahon and Ian Monaghan, attacked Robert Drake while he was sitting in his porch in Sligo, beating the American editor until he was unconscious. Drake, who had just moved to Sligo where his partner was working as a doctor, spent months in a coma before relocating to Philadelphia. As of 2023, nearly 25 years later, Drake still required a wheelchair and had no independent living. |

== 21st century ==
=== 2000s ===
| Date | Name | Deaths | Location | Summary |
|---|---|---|---|---|
| 2000 | Death of Brian Murphy | 1 | Dublin, Ireland | Brian Murphy is beaten to death by a gang of young men outside of the Burlington Hotel in Dublin. Only four men are charged in connection with the crime, which draws considerable media attention due to the privileged backgrounds of those involved. |
| 2000 | Disappearance of Trevor Deely | 1 | Dublin, Ireland | Having spent the evening at a Christmas party, 22 year-old Trevor Deely leaves to walk home and is never seen again. |
| 2004 | Murder of Paiche Onyemaechi | 1 | Piltown, County Kilkenny | Paiche Onyemaechi, the 25-year-old daughter of the Chief Justice of Malawi is reported missing and later discovered beheaded. Her husband later disappears and remains unaccounted for. Paiche's murder remains unsolved |
| 2004 | Murder of Rachel O'Reilly | 1 | Naul, County Dublin | Rachel O'Reilly, a 30-year-old mother of two was found fatally beaten in her Dublin home in 2004. Her husband Joe O'Reilly, who appeared on The Late Late Show to talk about the death of his partner, was later convicted of the murder and imprisoned in Portlaoise Prison. |
| 2004 | Death of Frog Ward | 1 | County Mayo, Ireland | In a highly controversial case, Pádraig Nally was charged with manslaughter and imprisoned for the killing of traveller John "Frog" Ward, who was shot dead for trespassing on Nally's farmland. Nally's conviction was later overturned and he was released. |
| 2005 | Death of Robert Holohan | 1 | County Cork, Ireland | Robert Holohan (age 11) disappeared in January 2005 after going out for a bike ride. His body was found eight days later, having been killed by neighbour and friend, 20 year-old student Wayne O'Donoghue. Some outlets compared the death of Robert Holohan to the 1986 disappearance of Philip Cairns |
| 2005 | Scissor Sisters case | 1 | Dublin, Ireland | Linda and Charlotte Mulhall stabbed and dismembered their mother's boyfriend, Kenyan immigrant Farah Swaleh Noor. |
| | Murder of Irene White | 1 | Dundalk, Ireland | Mother-of-three was stabbed to death at her house in Dundalk in 2005. Investigations later revealed that her death was the result of a contract killing. |
| 2006 | Murder of Siobhan Kearney | 1 | Goatstown, Dublin | On the morning of his 49th birthday, at their home in Goatstown in Dublin, Brian Kearney strangled his wife Siobhan to death with a vacuum cord and arranged the scene to make the death look like a suicide. |
| 2006 | Murder of Denis Donaldson | 1 | Classey, Glenties, County Donegal | Denis Donaldson, a volunteer in the Provisional Irish Republican Army (IRA) and a member of Sinn Féin, was murdered following his exposure in December 2005 as an informer of MI5 and the Special Branch of the Police Service of Northern Ireland (PSNI). It was initially believed that the Provisional IRA were responsible for his killing, although the Real IRA claimed responsibility for his murder almost 3 years later. |
| 2006 | Murder of Paul Quinn | 1 | Tullycoora, near Oram, County Monaghan | Paul Quinn, from Cullyhanna in County Armagh, was lured to a farm near Oram in County Monaghan by a group of ten or more men, who savagely beat him with iron bars, breaking every major bone in his body. He died in hospital a few hours after the attack. The chief suspects in the case are local elements of the IRA. |
| 2006 | Murder of Sylvia Roche-Kelly | 1 | Limerick, Ireland | Following a chance meeting in a Limerick nightclub while celebrating her 33rd birthday, Jerry McGrath brought mother-of-two Sylvia Roche-Kelly back to his hotel room, where he beat and strangled her, leaving her naked body face down in the bathtub. The case formed part of the scope of the Guerin Report into alleged corruption within the Garda Síochána |
| 2008 | Murder of Shane Geoghegan | 1 | Limerick, Ireland | Shane Geoghegan, a 28-year-old Limerick native was shot dead in a case of mistaken identity. The murder coincided with an escalation in gangland violence between rival gangs in an ongoing Limerick feud. 23 year-old Barry Doyle from Portland Row, Dublin was charged with the murder and sentenced to life in prison. John Dundon from Limerick City, was also charged with the murder and sentenced to life in prison in 2012 |
| 2008 | Operation Seabight | — | County Cork, Ireland | Seizure of up to €750 million of cocaine off the West Cork coast in November 2008. A 60-foot (18 m) yacht containing more than seventy bales of the substance was seized by a team of European anti-drugs agencies led by the Irish authority forces. Three men were also apprehended and later each was sentenced to ten years in jail. |
| 2008 | Whelan family murders | 3 | Windgap, County Kilkenny | On Christmas morning 2008, Brian Hennessy enters the home of 30 year-old Sharon Whelan. Hennessy claims that they had sex, but others believe he raped her. To cover up whatever did transpire, Hennessy strangled Whelan to death in her bedroom, then burned down her house to further eliminate evidence of the crime. Whelan's two daughters; 7 year-old Zara and 2 year-old Nadia, who were fast asleep at the time of the killing, perish in the fire. In late 2009, Hennessy is sentenced to life imprisonment. |
| 2009 | Murder of Roy Collins | 1 | Limerick, Ireland | Roy Collins, a 35-year-old Limerick native was gunned down at the family owned business in April 2009. Collins who had no involvement in the ongoing Limerick feud was targeted after giving evidence against known Limerick criminals following an earlier incident. The murder prompted Roy's father, Steve to campaign for tougher laws to deal with gangland violence in Ireland. Wayne Dundon and Nathan Killeen, both from Limerick, have been charged with the murder. The Collins family have since fled Limerick under a witness protection programme. |
| 2009 | Bank of Ireland robbery | — | College Green branch of the Bank of Ireland, Dublin, Ireland | €7.6 million is stolen in a tiger kidnapping from a branch of the Bank of Ireland. So far seven people have been arrested and €4 million of the stolen money found scattered throughout Dublin. |

=== 2010s ===
| Date | Name | Deaths | Location | Summary |
|---|---|---|---|---|
| 2010 | Stabbing of Toyosi Shittabey | 1 | Tyrrelstown, Dublin | Nigerian teenager Toyosi Shittabey, age 15, was fatally stabbed during an altercation. The case invoked widespread outcry relating to racism in Ireland. |
| 2012 | Murder of Elaine O'Hara | 1 | Remains found in Kilakee, near the Dublin Mountains, Ireland | Architect Graham Dwyer lured childcare worker Elaine O'Hara to a local park and stabbed her to death. Her body was discovered by a dogwalker in the Dublin Mountains almost a year later. |
| 2013 | Murder of Adrian Donohoe | 1 | Bellurgan, Jenkinstown County Louth, Ireland | Detective Garda Adrian Donohoe was fatally shot by an armed gang of five men during a robbery on a credit union while on duty. The suspects were believed to be part of a criminal gang with links to Republican paramilitary and terror organisations, operating in the border region. In 2020, Aaron Brady was sentenced to 40 years for the capital murder of Detective Garda Donohoe. |
| 2013 | Death of Dean Fitzpatrick | 1 | Dublin, Ireland | Dean Fitzpatrick, brother of the missing Amy Fitzpatrick, was stabbed to death by his own stepfather Dave Mahon. |
| 2013 | Murders of Jack and Tommy Blaine | 2 | Castlebar, County Mayo, Ireland | Brothers Jack and Tommy Blaine, were found dead following a violent attack in July 2013 in their Castlebar home. 26 year-old Alan Cawley was convicted of the double murder. |
| 2015 | Murder of Tony Golden | 2 | Omeath, County Louth | A dissident republican shot a Garda and a civilian before shooting himself. He died along with the Garda. |
| 2015 | Hutch–Kinahan feud | ~18 | Dublin (primarily) | A major feud between two criminal organisations, led respectively by Gerry Hutch and Christy Kinahan, that has resulted in the deaths of at least 18 people. |
| 2015 | Disappearances of William Maughan and Anna Varslavane | — | Gormanstown, County Meath | A couple suspected of being murdered by those involved in the fatal shooting of Benny Whitehouse in Balbriggan in 2014. |
| 2016 | Regency Hotel shooting | 1 | Whitehall, Dublin | A gangland shooting associated with the Hutch–Kinahan feud. One person was killed, two wounded when gunmen disguised as Gardaí entered the Regency Hotel and opened fire. |
| 2016 | Hawe Family Murders | 5 | Barconey, County Cavan | In August 2016, Alan Hawe murdered his wife Clodagh and three children, Liam, Niall, and Ryan before committing suicide in their home in Cavan |
| 2017 | Murder of Patricia O'Connor | 1 | Wicklow Mountains | The dismembered remains of 61 year-old Patricia O'Connor were found scattered along a road in the Wicklow Mountains. Several people were arrested in connection with the death, which is believed to have occurred after O'Connor was struck over the head with a blunt instrument during an argument. In February 2020, Kieran Greene was found guilty of murdering his former partner's mother. Several other members of the O'Connor family were charged with impeding the apprehension or prosecution of Greene. |
| 2017 | Disappearance and Murder of Tina Dingivan | 1 | Youghal, County Cork | In March 2017, Tina Dingivan (a native of Fermoy, County Cork) was reported to Gardaí as missing by her husband Richard Satchwell. An extensive search ensued over the following years. In October 2023, her remains were found entombed in concrete beneath the floor of their home in Youghal, County Cork. Richard Satchwell was subsequently arrested and charged with her murder. The murder trial was held at the Central Criminal Court, with Satchwell convicted and sentenced to life imprisonment. |
| 2018 | Murder of Ana Kriégel | 1 | Lucan, Dublin | 14-year-old schoolgirl Anastasia 'Ana' Kriégel was reported missing after she did not return home from St. Catherine's Park in Leixlip. Three days later, her naked body was found in a derelict farmhouse in Lucan; she had been sexually assaulted and beaten to death. Two 14-year-old boys who remain unidentified for legal reasons have been convicted of her murder. |
| 2018 | Murder of Jastine Valdez | 2 | Enniskerry, County Wicklow | 24-year-old student Jastine Valdez was abducted and murdered by 40 year-old Mark Hennessy on 19 May. Hennessy was shot dead a day later by Garda officers and Valdez's body was found in Rathmichael, County Dublin. |
| 2018 | Bray boxing club shooting | 1 | Bray, County Wicklow | Three men were shot, one fatally, in a boxing gym in Bray County Wicklow in June 2018. One of the survivors was Pete Taylor, father of Olympian Katie Taylor. |
| 2019 | Coolock feud | ~5 | Coolock, Dublin | A number of murders in Dublin are attributed to a "gangland feud" between drug dealers in the north Dublin suburb of Coolock. |
| 2019 | Kidnapping of Kevin Lunney | — | Counties Cavan and Fermanagh | In September 2019, Kevin Lunney, the chief operating officer of Quinn Industrial Holdings (QIH), was abducted from his home just off the Stragowna Road, on the northern outskirts of Derrylin in the south of County Fermanagh, and tortured. Lunney was later found, badly injured, in County Cavan. In November 2019, one of the alleged suspects died of a heart-attack following a police raid on his home in Great Britain. In 2021, three men are sentenced to between 18 and 30 years. |

=== 2020s ===
| Date | Name | Deaths | Location | Summary |
|---|---|---|---|---|
| 2020 | Killing of Keane Mulready-Woods | 1 | Drogheda, County Louth | The dismembered body of a Drogheda teenager, who disappeared in January 2020, was found in Dublin. He had reputedly been involved in the mugging of convicted criminal Robbie Lawlor and associated with one of the factions in the so-called "Drogheda feud". |
| 2021 | 2021 Munster abuse case | — | Munster | In a criminal trial in 2021, five adults were found guilty of multiple counts of sexual abuse committed against five children in Munster. |
| 2022 | Murder of Ashling Murphy | 1 | Tullamore, County Offaly | In January 2022, school teacher Ashling Murphy was killed in a day-time attack on the banks of the Grand Canal, County Offaly. She had been out for a run when she was murdered. Her death prompted government promises for a national strategy to "tackle sexual, domestic, and gender-based violence in Ireland". |
| 2022 | Murders of Aidan Moffitt and Michael Snee | 2 | Sligo | In April 2022, Aidan Moffitt (aged 42) and Michael Snee (aged 58) were found murdered in their own homes, in the space of 24 hours. Both men were found with serious physical injuries due to a physical assault, around 1 km apart in the town. Gardaí probed links to a serial killer. 22-year-old Yousef Palani was arrested, subsequently charged, and sentenced to life imprisonment. |
| 2022 | Murders of Lisa Cash, Christy Cawley and Chelsea Cawley | 3 | Tallaght, South County Dublin | In September 2022, Lisa Cash and her twin siblings Christy and Chelsea Cawley were stabbed in their home. Their brother raised the alarm by jumping out of the window. A man in his twenties was arrested and subsequently charged. |
| 2022 | Murder of Natalie McNally | 1 | Lurgan, County Armagh | In December 2022, Natalie McNally was found stabbed and beaten to death in her home in Lurgan. She was 15 weeks pregnant at the time she was killed. Her former boyfriend Stephen McCullagh was later charged with her murder |
| 2023 | 2023 Dublin Riot | — | Dublin | In November 2023, riots break out in Dublin following a mass-stabbing by Riad Bouchaker. This resulted in a number of trials of rioters from 2023 to 2025. Bouchaker's trial began in June 2026. |
