= Glachan =

Glachan is a surname. Notable people with the surname include:

- Caroline Glachan (1982–1996), Scottish murder victim
- Ian Glachan (1934–2005), Australian politician

== See also ==
- Glassan
