= Murder of Raonaid Murray =

- An image of Raonaid which was widely circulated in the aftermath.
- Location: 53.281609°N 6.131435°W
- Date: c.September 3, 1999

Raonaid Murray (6 January 1982 – 4 September 1999) was an Irish teenager who was stabbed to death at the age of 17 in the early hours of 4 September 1999. As of March 2023, this murder case remains unsolved. The murder weapon has not been located either. Each year her family and the Garda Síochána issue new appeals for fresh information.

By 2008, Raonaid was said to have "achieved iconic status", according to Kim Bielenberg of the Irish Independent, who remarked in one article that her image was still to be seen on the front pages of Ireland's newspapers on a regular basis. The case has been compared in the media to other unsolved incidents such as the disappearance of schoolboy Philip Cairns in 1986.

== Background of victim ==
Raonaid Murray was born on 6 January 1982 to parents Jim and Deirdre Murray and lived in Glenageary, South Dublin. Raonaid is the Irish name for Rachel. She had two siblings, an older brother and an older sister. She attended St Joseph of Cluny secondary school in Killiney where she achieved highly in her Junior Certificate before completing her Leaving Certificate examinations in June 1999. Upon finishing school, she worked part-time in a fashion boutique in Dún Laoghaire but intended to re-sit her Leaving Cert at the Institute of Education in Leeson Street and hoped to attend the arts faculty in University College Dublin upon completion. She liked reading and poetry, with her favourite play being Under Milk Wood by Dylan Thomas, and hoped to one day be a success as a professional writer. She wore a blue stud in her nose, was known for dressing in bright colours and pursued an active social life.

== Murder ==
Raonaid spent the evening of 3 September 1999 socialising in Scotts pub on Georges Street, Dún Laoghaire, a place she knew well. She had just finished her shift in the boutique at 9:00pm. It was to be the place where she was last seen alive. She left at approximately 11.20pm, planning to meet friends again later, and started the 15-minute walk home. It is believed that she argued with a man described as being in his mid 20s an estimated 25 minutes after leaving the pub in the laneway between Silchester Road and her home in Silchester Park. Witnesses heard a female voice expressing a cry of "leave me alone", "go away" or something similar. "Fuck off" was also heard. This was followed by a scream. Raonaid was stabbed four times in the side, chest and shoulder with a one-and-a-half-inch sharp knife while in Silchester Crescent. Her murderer escaped and Raonaid staggered 200 feet before she collapsed and died from her injuries. Her body was found by her sister Sarah 50 yards from her home, at 12:20am on the morning of Saturday 4 September. Raonaid was not sexually assaulted nor were her possessions stolen.

== Investigation ==
Walk and Cycle Track between Silchester Park

An investigation was launched; however, a motive has never been found.

More than 100 Gardaí were assigned to the case at its peak. By 2008, more than 8,000 people had been interviewed and almost 3,000 statements taken. There were 12 arrests. The knife used to murder Raonaid has never been found.

In the build-up to the first anniversary of Raonaid's murder in 2000, there were fresh appeals for information by Gardaí and Detective Inspector Eamon O'Reilly appealed to listeners of Morning Ireland for assistance.

Each year, Raonaid's family issue an appeal for more information. They have offered a reward of €190,000. These appeals for information have been renewed, particularly with authorities suspecting that any young people who may have witnessed the crime may now have reached the correct level of maturity to discuss what they saw. On the tenth anniversary of Raonaid's murder in 2009, gardaí issued descriptions of a male and female who they wanted to interview on the matter.

=== Profile of killer ===
A forensic profile of the killer suggested that it would be a young man, in his mid- to late twenties, single, living either alone or with his mother. He would have been a loner, possibly with a drug problem, and may have been in psychiatric care at some point. He would also have had a history of anti-social behaviour and would be unlikely to have had any intimate relationships. The profile indicated a likelihood he would kill again.

=== Suspects ===
There have been suspects for the murder since it took place:

- The earliest suspect was a man in his mid-twenties, five foot ten in height, with sandy-coloured Oasis-style hair like that of Noel Gallagher, who was wearing light coloured combat trousers and a beige top seen arguing with her less than an hour before she was killed.
- A taxi-driver reported picking up a young man with blood on his trousers in the early hours of that Saturday morning and taking him to Granville Road at the top of Newtownpark Avenue, Blackrock. He dropped the man at a house there and felt he did not see him go inside. House-to-house inquiries carried out at the time did not find anyone fitting the description living on the road. Later in the investigation, a suspect was found to have been living at the time on the other side of Newtownpark Avenue. He was arrested and questioned, but there was no evidence.
- A cook was arrested and questioned but later released without charge.
- A young man seen dancing with Raonaid at a nightclub and then "hassling" her in an Abrakebabra fast food restaurant on 29 July 1999.
- Farah Swaleh Noor, a Kenyan immigrant who was killed and dismembered in March 2005 by Linda and Charlotte Mulhall, two sisters from Dublin. He allegedly threatened their mother, Kathleen Mulhall saying "I'm going to fucking kill you, just like I did with Raonaid Murray", although he was allegedly drunk at the time. Noor, who was questioned during the initial investigation, has since been ruled out; Gardaí believe he claimed responsibility to upset Mulhall.

== Cold case investigation ==
A unit of experienced Gardaí called The Garda Serious Crime Review Team under detective superintendent Christy Mangan began a review of the case in July 2008. They identified a number of mistakes and oversights in the original investigation. It recommended renewed searches for the murder weapon and found areas of failings:

- It determined that some potential witnesses who came forward with information at the time were not followed up correctly.
- There was tension between Garda units during the original investigation which meant that communication was not as effective as it could have been.
- Irregularities in a statement by one witness including an allegation of forgery which was referred to the Garda Síochána Ombudsman Commission.

The review team suggested new theories:

- It was not the work of a random killer, that Raonaid knew her killer as there was no record of a similar attack happening before or after this particular crime anywhere in the Dublin region.
- The nature of the attack would suggest that whoever killed the victim held some sort of personal grudge. Raonaid may have been killed by a female; the woman may have been known to Raonaid and she could have been killed after a personal disagreement caused the schoolgirl to break off contact with her. They identified a woman in her 30s who had a reputation for violence against women. She left the country a year after the murder and still lives abroad.

== Tribute website ==
On 28 August 2009, a website was launched by Jim and Deirdre Murray as a tribute to Raonaid and to generate awareness of the case. It received 50,000 hits in its first two days. However, the website was taken down due to the posting of a large proportion of abusive messages, necessitating a further Garda investigation into the matter.

== See also ==
- List of unsolved deaths
