= Scissor Sisters (disambiguation) =

The Scissor Sisters are a pop band from New York.

Scissor Sisters may also refer to:

- Scissor Sisters (album), the eponymous band's 2004 debut studio recording
- Scissor Sisters (convicted killers), two sisters from Dublin convicted of murder in 2005
- Scissor sister, pejorative slang meaning lesbian
