= Toyosi =

- Language: Yoruba

Origin
- Meaning: Worth rejoicing in the lord
- Region of origin: West Africa

Other names
- Variant forms: Toyose, Omotoyosi, Oluwatoyosi

listen

Toyosi is a Yoruba given name meaning "Worth rejoicing in the lord".

== Notable people with the name include ==
- Toyosi Akerele-Ogunsiji, Nigerian social entrepreneur
- Oluwatoyosi Ogunseye, Nigerian journalist
- Gbenga Toyosi Olawepo, Nigerian human rights activist and businessman
- Toyosi Olusanya, English footballer
- Toyosi Shittabey, Irish murder victim
