= Eamonn Cooke =

Owner of a pirate radio station

Eamonn Cooke (c.1936 – June 2016) was a former owner of pirate radio station Radio Dublin. He was a convicted paedophile, and a suspect in the disappearance of Philip Cairns. He assumed ownership of the station in 1977.

== Pirate radio ==
As owner of Radio Dublin he went by the name "Captain Cooke". Having first got involved with Radio Dublin in 1973 as an engineer, he assumed ownership of the station in 1977 (which had been operating for over a decade prior under various other owners) and established the operation as a limited company (based in Cardiff). He continued to operate the station until some months before its closure in 2003. Despite numerous (but highly intermittent) raids by the authorities on the station in which large amounts of equipment were seized he was only successfully prosecuted for broadcasting offences on one occasion for which he received an IR£35 fine.

== Trials ==
=== 1952 ===
An unnamed teenager (probably Cooke) was sentenced to 12 months probation after a bomb attack on a Monument in Glasnevin Cemetery in Dublin.

=== 1957 ===
Cooke is sentenced to 5 years penal servitude after he pleaded guilty to shooting at four gardaí during an attempted robbery at a petrol station near Bray.

=== 1978 ===
In March Cooke is convicted in the District Court of a breach of the 1926 Wireless Telegraphy Act following raids on the station January and February of the same year

=== 1986 ===
Cooke (along with four accomplices) is convicted of assault and arson in relation to a 1984 firebombing incident and received a four-year suspended sentence

=== 2001 ===
Cooke was jailed for six months for dangerous driving and 21 days for contempt of court in relation to a car chase in the Dublin mountains. He had kidnapped his daughter Karen from state care at the time.

=== 2003 ===
His first trial in relation to sex offences was in 2003, where he was convicted of the attempted rape and indecent assault of four girls. This conviction was quashed due to a technicality and he was released in 2006.

=== 2007 ===
He was put on trial again in 2007, where two complainants from the previous trial were witnesses. He had threatened and bribed his victims, who nicknamed him "The Cookie Monster". Cooke pleaded not guilty to all 42 charges, which covered dates from the mid to late 1970s. Garda Inspector Gerard Kelly testified that Cooke had eight previous convictions, including one for an arson attack on the home of one of the complainants from the 2003 trial. He was found guilty and sentenced to ten years imprisonment, with prison authorities to take into account 1,300 days he had served due to a previous conviction.

2010

He faced trial for sexually abusing his daughter Karen. He was convicted of seventeen counts of sexual assault and twelve counts of rape. He was sentenced to life in prison.

Karen waived her anonymity in 2026.

2015

In 2015 he applied for an appeal for his conviction on a point of law but it was denied.

== Alleged connection to Philip Cairns disappearance ==
In May 2016 a woman contacted Gardaí about the disappearance of Philip Cairns which they believed to be credible. According to her Cooke may have killed Philip Cairns at the studios of his pirate radio station in October 1986. Cooke was questioned by Gardaí and it was reported that he had confirmed some of the claims, but did not disclose the location of Philip's remains. It later emerged that at the time of questioning Cooke had dementia.

In August 2016 it was announced that DNA samples taken from Philips' schoolbag did not match Cooke, but he had not been ruled out as a suspect. Gardaí also sought to identify two people who may have left Philips' schoolbag in the laneway.

== Death ==
He died in June 2016. He was granted temporary release from Arbour Hill Prison and had stayed in a hospice due to deteriorating health.
