= Disappearance of Trevor Deely =

Unsolved 2000 disappearance of Irish 22 year-old man from Dublin

Trevor Deely
- Born: 15 August 1978; Dublin, Ireland
- Disappeared: 8 December 2000 (aged 22); Dublin, Ireland
- Status: Missing for 25 years, 11 months and 4 days
- Occupation: Worked at Bank of Ireland
- Height: 6 ft (1.83 m)
- Parents: Michael Deely (father); Ann Deely (mother)

Locations 8 December 2000
1 04:03 Bank of Ireland, Asset Management, Wilton Terrace, Dublin where Trevor Deely was last seen in person.
2 04:14 AIB Bank, Baggot St Bridge/Haddington Road, Dublin where Trevor Deely was last seen on CCTV.
3 Renoir complex, his home on Serpentine Avenue in Ballsbridge.

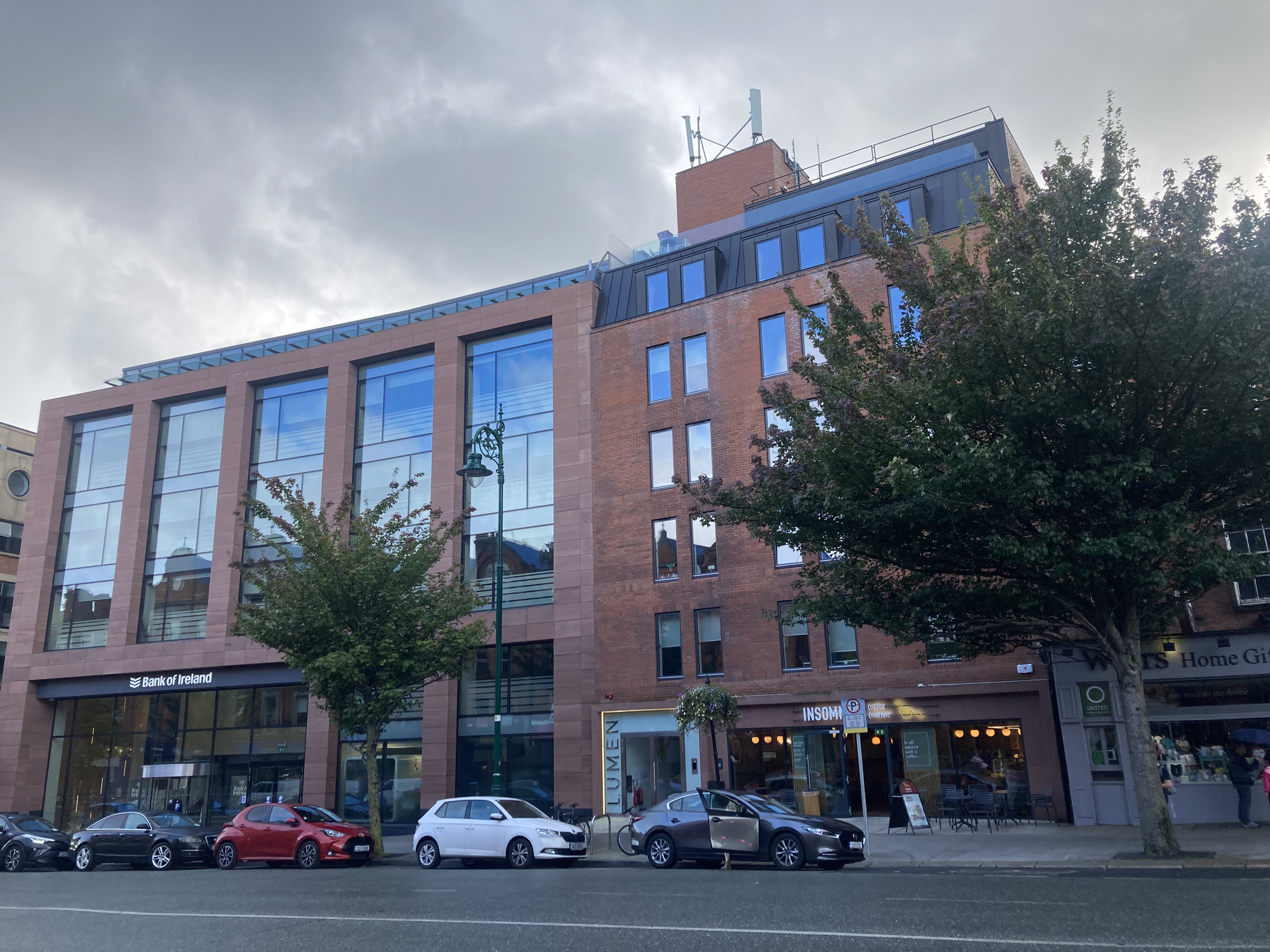
Bank of Ireland, Baggot Plaza, Upper Baggot Street location of Trevor Deely's last known sighting on CCTV when it was AIB Bank.

On 8 December 2000, Trevor Deely, a 22-year-old Irish man, disappeared in Dublin. He had been walking home around 4 am from his work Christmas party, having stopped at his office to retrieve an umbrella and prepare for his shift the next day. Security cameras recorded him entering and leaving the building, including a brief exchange with an unidentified man dressed in black. Deely was later captured on another camera outside a bank on Haddington Road as he continued home on foot; this is the last known image of him. Despite extensive and ongoing police investigations, his disappearance remains unsolved.

== Background ==
Trevor Deely was born on 15 August 1978, the youngest of four siblings of Michael and Ann Deely. He grew up in Naas, County Kildare, in Ireland. After finishing school, Deely studied business at the Waterford Institute of Technology but dropped out in his second year. He subsequently completed a computer course in Dublin. In May 1999, he began working in the IT department of Bank of Ireland Asset Management on Leeson Street.

In late November 2000, just weeks before his disappearance, Deely flew to Alaska in the United States. He flew on a discount that his friend procured for him due to his role as a long-haul flight attendant, which his friend described as 'free'. He went over to see a girl that he had met in Dublin during the summer while she was holidaying in Ireland.

== Disappearance ==
The Christmas party was scheduled for Thursday 7 December. After drinks in Copper Face Jacks and the Hilton Hotel, the party moved to Buck Whaley's nightclub on Lower Leeson Street. Deely left Buck Whaley's at about 3:25 am. He started walking in the direction of his apartment in the Renoir complex, on Serpentine Avenue in Ballsbridge. There was a heavy storm that night with gusts as high as 60 or 70 mph, and there was also a taxi strike. About ten minutes after leaving the nightclub, Deely arrived at his office, and was let in after calling security. While in his office Deely made a cup of tea and spoke to a colleague, Karl Pender, who was working the night shift. He also checked his emails and made a note of things he needed to do in work the following morning. He left the office at 4:03 am, taking an umbrella with him, and continued in the direction of Ballsbridge. Around this time he rang a friend of his in Naas and left a voicemail. His friend described the message as saying "'Hi, Glen, I've missed you there. Just on my way home, all going good, I'll talk to you tomorrow.' Or words to that very close effect." His friend deleted the message, not regarding it as significant and investigators never sought to retrieve it.

CCTV footage shows that a man dressed in black was waiting outside the gates of the bank for approximately half an hour before Deely arrived. When Deely arrived, they had a brief conversation. Two minutes after Deely entered the bank, two more men arrived at the gate. While the other two men have since been cleared as colleagues of Deely, the man in black remains a person of interest and was no longer waiting outside by the time Deely left the bank.

CCTV image of Trevor Deely's last known sighting, AIB Bank, Baggot Street

At 4:14 am CCTV footage shows Deely walking past what was then the AIB bank on the corner of Baggot Street Bridge and Haddington Road in the direction of his flat. About thirty seconds later a man dressed in black passed by the AIB bank. Gardaí initially believed that this was the same man who had spoken to Deely outside his office, but they subsequently identified and interviewed the man who was captured by the AIB CCTV footage and have indicated that they are satisfied that there is nothing suspicious about his movements, and that he is not the same man who had spoken to Deely outside his office. This footage represents the last known sighting of Deely.

== Investigation ==
Deely's absence from work the following morning was not seen as a cause for concern as it had been a late night. Additionally, his flatmates were away that weekend so they did not know he was missing either. Only when Deely failed to show up the following Monday were alarm bells raised. His work informed his family. After ascertaining that nobody had spoken to Deely that weekend, they reported him as a missing person.

Over the following days Deely's family and friends put up hundreds of posters, handed out thousands of leaflets and went from house to house and business to business inquiring if people had seen him. His friends were able to obtain the CCTV footage used in the investigation. Det. Sgt Michael Fitzgerald, who worked on the case from the beginning said "I've never worked on a case where the family were so proactive." The delay between Deely being last seen and reported as missing meant that vital time was lost.

The Garda sub-aqua team searched the river Dodder and the Grand Canal but did not find anything. They were unable to drain the Grand Canal Basin as it would affect the structural integrity of the surrounding buildings. Deely's sister, Michele, said that she rang his phone a few times the weekend he went missing and she believes that it rang out. According to Dr. Philip Perry, a senior research fellow in the radio and optical communications laboratory at Dublin City University, a phone in 2000 would have gone dead within seconds of falling into the water. However, Michele said she is not 100% sure that it did actually ring.

Two Gardaí travelled to Alaska to speak to the girl who Deely had gone over to see before his disappearance. Deely's sisters also travelled to Alaska separately for the same purpose. The trips did not produce any leads.

== Later developments ==
Deely's whereabouts remain unknown and the case continues to spark interest. A special documentary hosted by Donal MacIntyre aired on TV3 in 2015. Donal MacIntyre: Unsolved episode 8, entitled 'The Case of Trevor Deely', featured the case.

In December 2016 a new investigation was opened. The following April, enhanced CCTV footage was released, leading to the announcement by Gardaí that they believed that the man dressed in black seen behind Deely on the Haddington Road footage was the same man that he spoke to outside his office. That same month a €100,000 reward was offered for information.

In August 2017, Gardaí began a search of a three-acre secluded area in the Dublin suburb of Chapelizod, about 8 kilometres from where Deely was last seen. An informant alleged that Deely was murdered on the night of his disappearance by a Crumlin-based criminal known to Gardaí. The gang he was in was involved in the drugs and prostitution trade in the area where Deely disappeared. The same gang was investigated for the murder of Sinead Kelly in June 1998. The informant said that Deely and his alleged murderer had not known each other and it was a chance encounter. Although a gun and drugs were found during the search, investigators concluded that they were not related to the case, calling the site a 'stash area' for criminals. The search was called off in September and Gardaí said at the time that they had not found anything that would assist them in the case.

In December 2023 Mark Deely, brother of Trevor Deely, said that the video of Deely on Haddington Road had been digitally enhanced and Gardaí had determined that there was nothing suspicious about the movements of the man in black who is seen walking along the footpath approximately 30 seconds behind Deely. The man seen in the video had been traced and interviewed and was no longer a person of interest, and was not the same man who had spoken to Deely outside his office earlier in the night. They are yet to identify the man waiting outside the bank for 30 minutes before Deely arrived or figure out why his two coworkers were standing outside the gate after Deely went in.

In December 2024, Gardaí again appealed for information relating to Deely's disappearance, including the identity of the man in black standing outside the bank on the night of the disappearance. In June 2025, Gardaí confirmed that the case remained a missing person investigation and not a murder investigation.

== See also ==
- List of people who disappeared mysteriously: post-1970
