= Donal MacIntyre: Unsolved =

- Genre: Reality; Crime
- Created by: Donal MacIntyre
- Starring: Donal MacIntyre; Nicola Tallant; Elizabeth Yardley; Clive Driscoll; David Wilson
- Country of origin: United Kingdom
- No. of series: 1
- No. of episodes: 10 (list of episodes)

Production
- Production location: Various
- Camera setup: Single-camera setup
- Running time: 60 minutes
- Production company: AMC Networks

Original release
- Network: CBS Reality
- Release: 11 October 2015 – 11 January 2016

Donal MacIntyre: Unsolved is a British crime reality series in which investigative journalist and self-proclaimed criminologist Donal MacIntyre investigates a number of well noted "cold cases", for which the police have never been able to reach a conclusion. Working alongside a self-assembled cold case team, MacIntyre revisits each case by re-interviewing witnesses, investigating officers and reviewing physical evidence in the hope that "fresh eyes" can release new information and possible theories, which could lead to closure for the family and friends of each of the victims. The series began broadcasting on CBS Reality on 11 October 2015. A total of ten episodes have been broadcast to date.

== Cold case team ==
The cold case team featured in the series is made up of three well known and documented cold-case investigators with experience of similar cases to those featured.

- Donal MacIntyre – a self-proclaimed criminologist and investigative journalist, known for his undercover work with the Daily Mail
- Nicola Tallant – former chief crime reporter for the Sunday World who covered many of the investigations featured during her time with the paper (episodes 1–5)
- Dr. Elizabeth Yardley – professor of sociology and criminology at the University of Birmingham (episodes 6–10)
- Clive Driscoll – a retired DCI from the Metropolitan Police with over 35 years experience dealing with murders and abductions in the London area

Each episode also features analysis from Professor David Wilson, a criminologist and psychologist with over 20 years experience, most notable for his work and investigation into the murders committed by serial killer Steve Wright.

== Episode list ==
=== Series 1 (2015) ===
The first series of ten episodes began broadcasting on 11 October 2015.

- Cases that have been filmed but not yet broadcast include the case of Sophie Du Plantier; the case of John Luper; and the case of Amy Fitzpatrick.

No.	Title	Viewers	Original release date
1	"The Case of Daniel Entwistle"	137,000	11 October 2015
Donal and his team investigate the disappearance of seven-year-old Daniel Entwistle, who disappeared on a bank holiday weekend in 2003 in the seaside town of Great Yarmouth. They explore the possibility that he may have been the victim of a paedophile ring operating in the area, or may have been the victim of a schoolboy prank which ended in tragedy.
2	"The Case of Alan Wood"	146,000	18 October 2015
Donal tackles the murder of fifty-year-old supermarket worker and gardener Alan Wood, who was murdered in his own home in Lound, Lincolnshire in October 2009. Theories suggested include the possibility that his murder was a case of mistaken identity, linked to his workplace, or that his involvement with prostitutes may have led him into a murky underworld of sleaze.
3	"The Case of Natalie Pearman"	171,000	25 October 2015
Donal once again heads east as he investigates the murder of 16-year-old Natalie Pearman, who was found dead in November 1992 after working the red light district in Norwich. Donal looks into her troubled past in an attempt to discover whether or not Natalie's sordid lifestyle was responsible for her death, or whether she may have been the victim of a serial killer.
4	"The Case of Annie McCarrick"	157,000	1 November 2015
Donal heads back to his native Ireland to investigate the disappearance of 26-year-old American student Annie McCarrick, who disappeared on her birthday in 1993 after heading up to the Dublin mountains. Theories proposed include that she may have fallen victim to a serial killer operating in the area, or that her disappearance may have been linked to the IRA.
5	"The Case of Claudia Lawrence"	187,000	8 November 2015
Donal investigates the disappearance of 35-year-old Claudia Lawrence, who disappeared from the vicinity of her home in York in March 2009. Donal unravels a web of intricate private relationships that could have played a part in her death, and using a timeline of events containing substantial gaps, tries to determine, the exact moment that something sinister took place.
6	"The Case of Barry Rubery"	TBA	15 November 2015
Donal investigates the murder of 62-year-old retiree Barry Rubery, who was attacked and murdered in his own home in Iron Acton, Bristol in October 2010. He explores theories that Rubery may have been killed due to his association with Freemasonry, an angry client he met through his scrap metal business, or may have been the victim of travellers whom he had confronted several weeks previously.
7	"The Case of Valerie Graves"	TBA	22 November 2015
Donal investigates the motiveless murder of 55-year-old Valerie Graves, who was murdered in her sleep during her stay at a guest house that she was housesitting for friends in West Sussex in December 2013. Despite her family having also been sleeping in the house at the time, her killer managed to enter the property uninterrupted and commit the murder without anyone noticing.
8	"The Case of Trevor Deeley"	TBA	29 December 2015
Donal takes on the case of 22-year-old Trevor Deeley, who disappeared on 8 December 2000, following his works' Christmas party in Sandymount, Dublin. Evidence suggests he may have been followed on his way home, or may have been the victim of a freak accident caused by torrential weather conditions and the increased number of drunk-drivers due to a taxi strike.
9	"The Case of Penny Bell"	TBA	6 December 2015
Donal investigates the seemingly motiveless murder of 51-year-old Penny Bell, who was found dead in her car on 6 June 1991, in Uxbridge, near London. Having been stabbed over 50 times, Bell's death appears to have been at the hands of someone she knew. Donal explores the theory that she may have been being blackmailed in the days and weeks prior to her death.
10	"The Case of Caroline Glachan"	TBA	10 January 2016
In the last case of the series, Donal heads to Bonhill in Scotland to investigate the murder of 14-year-old Caroline Glachan, who was murdered on 24 August 1996 whilst walking the mile journey to her boyfriend's house. Donal explores the possibility that Caroline may have been a drugs mule, or the victim of somebody who assumed that she was.
