= Murder of Paiche Onyemaechi =

Unsolved murder in Piltown, Co. Kilkenny, Ireland

Paiche Onyemaechi
- Born: Paiche Unyolo; Malawi
- Died: June 2004 (aged 24)
- Occupations: lap dancing and former prostitute
- Known for: Disappearing and being found dead after being killed
- Spouse: Chika Onyemaechi
- Children: 2
- Father: Leonard Unyolo

Paiche Onyemaechi was a 25-year-old Malawian woman whose decapitated remains were discovered in Piltown, County Kilkenny in 2004. To date, her murder remains unsolved and her head has never been recovered.

== Background ==
Paiche Onyemaechi, born Paiche Unyolo, was born in Malawi. Her father is Leonard Unyolo, former Chief Justice of Malawi who was the incumbent Chief Justice at the time of her death.

Paiche left Malawi to study in business administration in London before arriving in Ireland as an asylum seeker with her first husband. She married Nigerian-born Chika Onyemaechi in Waterford in 2003. Together they had two children. Paiche and Chika received Irish residency with the birth of their first child.

Prior to her death, Paiche had worked at lap dancing clubs in Limerick and Dublin and had previously worked as a prostitute. She sometimes used the names 'Gina' and 'Cassandra' as well as the surname 'Willis'. At the time of her death, she was living in St Herblain Park in Waterford city.

== Death ==
Paiche had gone missing on a number of occasions in her life. Her final disappearance was reported on 10 July 2004, to Waterford Garda station.

Paiche's remains were discovered by a woman out walking at Brenor Bridge, Piltown, on 23 July 2004. Her decapitated body was wrapped in a black plastic bag and her head was missing. She had been badly beaten. She was later identified by fingerprints she had supplied when she applied for asylum.

== Investigation ==
Gardaí questioned Chika Onyemaechi about his wife's murder and he was released without charge. Gardaí searched the home where Paiche was living and discovered that sections of carpet were missing. A waste ground near her home was also searched, as was her car. Chika went missing shortly after his wife's murder and did not attend her funeral. Chika is still missing. Gardaí remain eager to speak to him.

Gardaí investigated the possibility that Paiche's murder was related to her work as a lap dancer and prostitute and interviewed a number of her clients.

Gardaí also investigated the possibility that the murder was a ritualistic killing. Following the murder of Farah Swaleh Noor, newspapers linked the crime with the murder of Paiche, labelling them the work of a 'voodoo killer.' Farah Swaleh Noor's murder was solved and had no ritualistic motive.

In 2004 an anonymous letter was sent to Gardaí which contained information on the culprits of the murder. The contents were not disclosed to the public.

In August 2004, two men were arrested for questioning into the murder and were later released without charge. A Nigerian woman was arrested for questioning in relation to the murder in October 2004 and was also released without charge.

In 2006, a Nigerian man named Chijioke Ezekwem was charged with failing to disclose information in relation to Paiche's murder.

In July 2024, twenty years after the murder, it was announced that Gardaí in Waterford were conducting a case review of the murder. Gardaí also renewed their appeal for information.

== Media ==
Paiche's murder attracted a large amount of media attention when it was learned that her father was the sitting Chief Justice of Malawi. However, the level of attention her murder received in comparison to white murder victims was criticised.

Paiche's murder has been covered in a number of true crime books including, Passport to Murder: True Stories of Foreginers Killed in Ireland by Ali Bracken, Dead Men Talk by Sandra Mara, and Blood Rights by Jimmy Lee Shreeve.

Paiche's murder inspired an art piece by Áine Phillips for her project The Lost Runway in 2010.

== See also ==
- List of solved missing person cases (post-2000)
- List of unsolved murders (2000–present)
