= 2009 Bank of Ireland robbery =

Crime in Dublin

Coordinates: 53.3448°N 6.2602°W

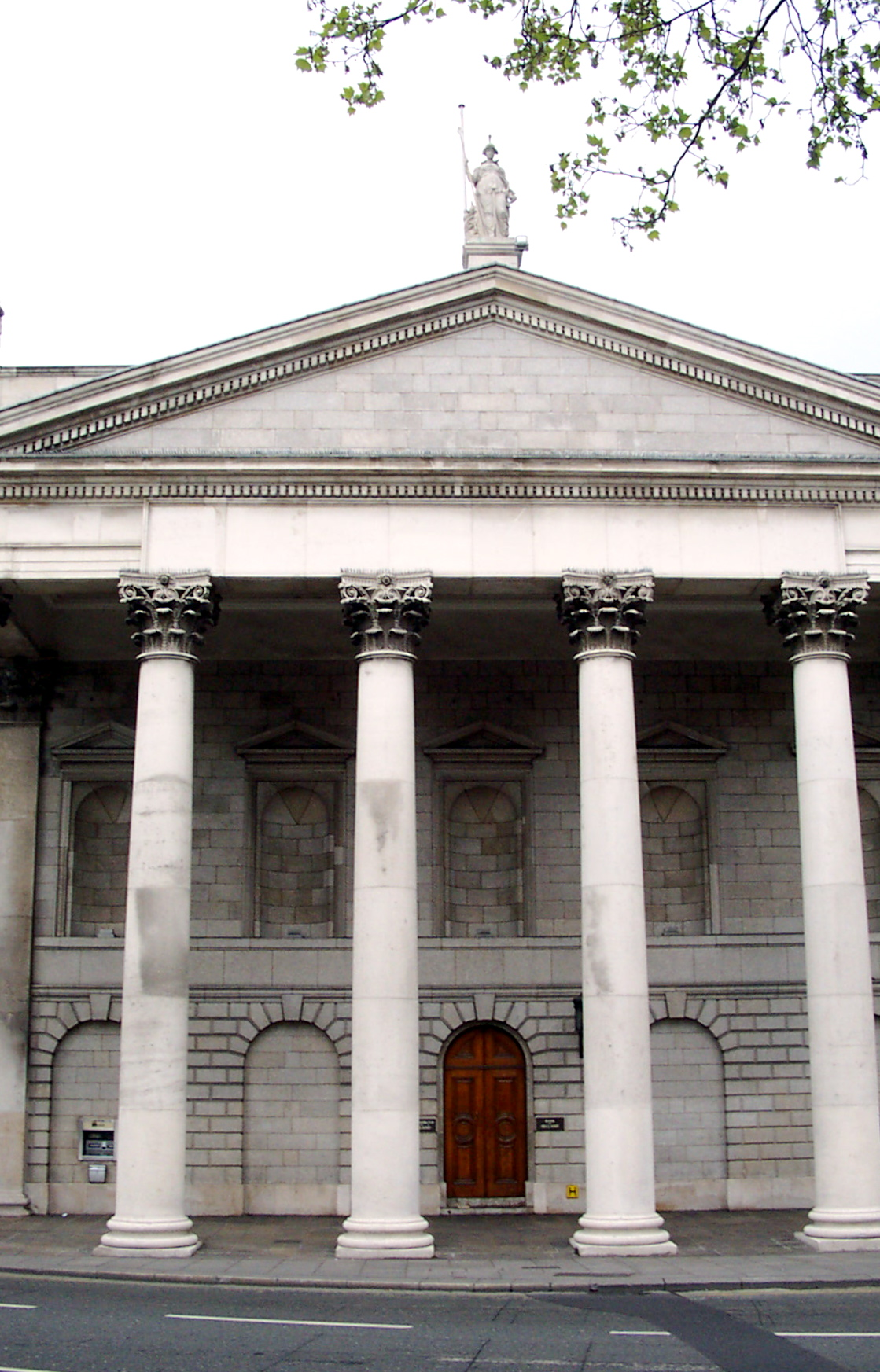
- The Bank of Ireland building on College Green
- Date: 27 February 2009
- Venue: College Green cash centre of the Bank of Ireland in Dublin, Ireland
- Location: Largest bank robbery in Ireland's history
- Arrests: 7 people in total were arrested who are believed to be part of the Dublin Gang

The 2009 Bank of Ireland robbery was a large robbery of cash from the College Green cash centre of the Bank of Ireland in Dublin, Ireland, on 27 February 2009. It was the largest bank robbery in Ireland's history. Criminals engaged in the tiger kidnapping of a junior bank employee, 24-year-old Shane Travers, and forced him to remove €7.6 million in cash from the bank as his girlfriend and two others were held hostage.

Ireland's Minister for Justice, Equality and Law Reform, Dermot Ahern, criticised the bank for its failure to follow what he termed "established protocols" during the robbery, as the Irish police force, the Garda Síochána, was not informed of the incident until the money had been removed from the bank. A manhunt was under way for the perpetrators, with seven people being arrested and €1.8 million of the stolen cash located, scattered across Dublin, on 28 February.

== Robbery ==
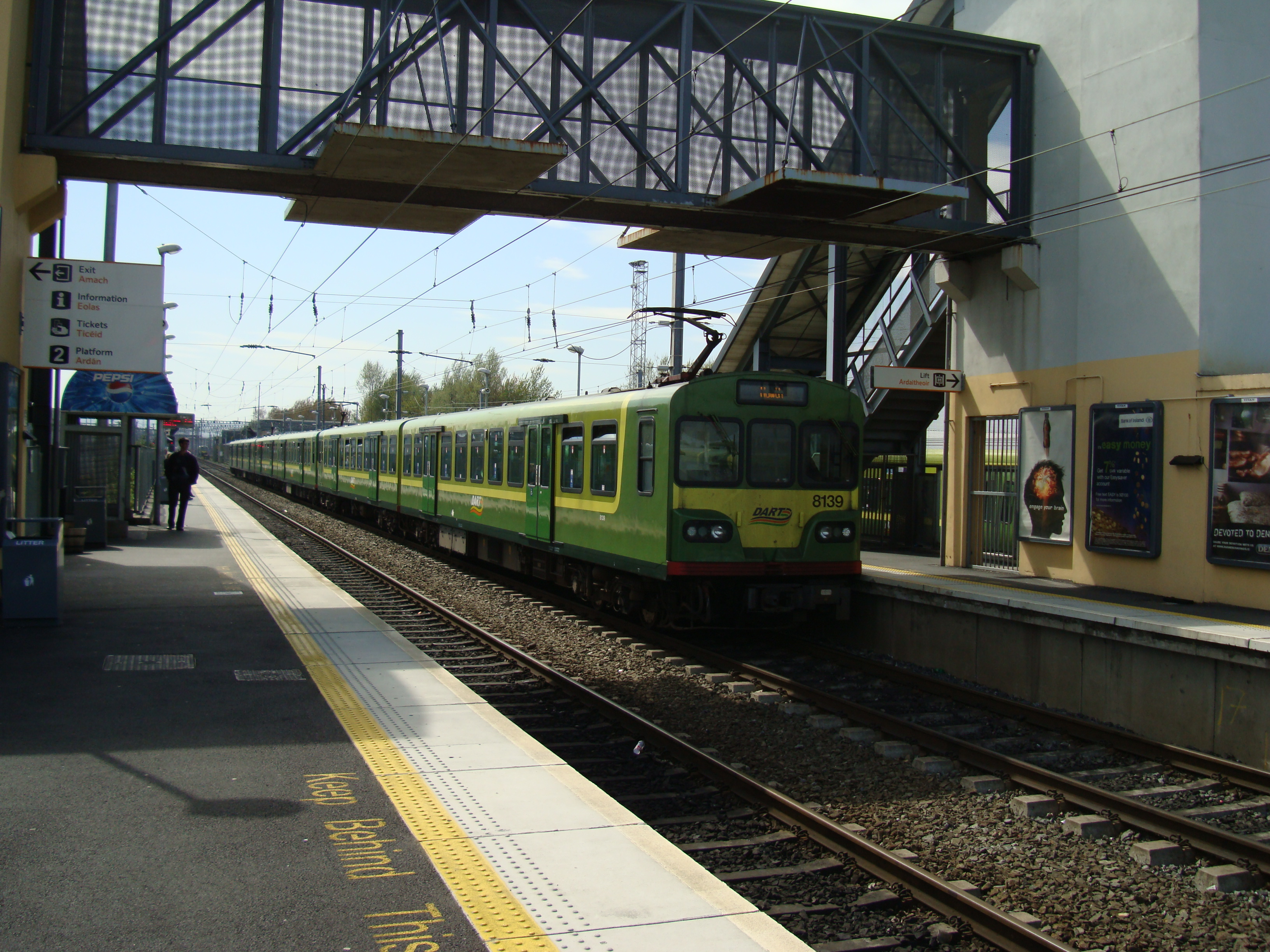
Clontarf Road railway station.

Late on the night of 26 February, Travers, whose father is a member of the Garda Síochána based at Clontarf, Dublin, was alone watching television at the home of his girlfriend near Kilteel, County Kildare. The woman and her mother were out shopping together. When they arrived home with the five-year-old nephew of Travers, six heavily built masked men, dressed in black and carrying handguns, jumped from the bushes.

The family was held overnight by the armed gang, during which time their mobile phones were confiscated and Travers' girlfriend was hit across the back of her head with a vase by one of the men. As dawn was arriving, the gang ordered all but Travers to enter their dark Volkswagen Golf family car. They were then bound together and driven to Ashbourne, County Meath.

The bank employee was given a mobile phone, ordered to collect €20, €50, €100 and €200 bank notes from his workplace, and supplied with a photograph of the rest of the family at gunpoint to convince his colleagues that their lives were under threat. Travers drove to Dublin in his red Toyota Celica car, acquired the cash through the assistance of colleagues who viewed the photo, and carried the money out of the building in four laundry bags. He took it to Clontarf Road railway station, whereupon he surrendered the cash and his sports car to a waiting gang member.

Travers then entered a garda station, the first point at which gardaí were notified that the robbery had taken place. One hour after this, the other family members succeeded in freeing themselves and walked to a nearby garda station. Travers' girlfriend required immediate medical treatment for a head wound she had received during a struggle with her captors, and the family were reported to be "traumatised" by their ordeal. Travers's car was later found burned out in an apartment block near Tolka House Pub in Glasnevin.

== Reaction ==
Minister for Justice, Equality and Law Reform Dermot Ahern said "proper procedures" were not followed during the course of the robbery, saying that gardaí should have been contacted before the money had left the bank. He also questioned how such a large sum of money could be taken as a result of one man being targeted. He has remarked, "Criminals are going for the line of least resistance, the human connection as it were. Given the fact there is so much detailed technology available to financial institutions, the line of least resistance is the human being."

The bank's chief executive, Richie Boucher, appointed just two days earlier, immediately wrote to all his staff to remind them that protocol should be followed in the event of future robberies, saying "Our priority is always for the safety and well-being of all staff. I am sure this incident will raise concerns. Our best defence is to follow tried and tested procedures. I would ask everybody to remind themselves of these procedures, which are there to protect you, your families and the bank."

The attack caused Charlie Flanagan, a Teachta Dála, to remark that "tiger kidnappings are taking place in Ireland ... at a rate of almost one per week."

== Arrests ==
€1.8 million of the stolen cash was recovered and seven people were arrested by gardaí in a number of incidents on 28 February. A house in Phibsboro was sealed off and ten more houses were searched. A total of five cars and one van were seized by gardaí. One of the men was arrested following a chase along the M50 near the Navan road, with two bales of packed cash being discovered in his car. Four other men were arrested in a car in Monk Place and in Great Western Square, Phibsboro, and two more were seized in a house on Great Western Villas, Phibsboro. Cash was also found in a car in Phibsboro.

The six men and one woman are believed to be members of a well-known gang from Dublin's north inner city and have connections to a major Dublin gangland figure. On 2 March, those arrested appeared before the High Court to challenge the lawfulness of their detention, viewing the warrants issued by the District Court the day before as invalid. That day, two of those arrested were released.

An unidentified bank employee was arrested on 28 January 2010 based on suspicion that the robbery had been an inside job. A man was given a five-year sentence for handling the robbery's stolen cash.

== See also ==
- 2004 Northern Bank robbery in Northern Ireland
- List of famous bank robbers and robberies
- List of major crimes in Ireland
