= Patrick Kennedy (banker) =

Governor of the Bank of Ireland

Governor of the Bank of Ireland
- Incumbent
- Assumed office 31 July 2018
- Preceded by: Archie Kane

Personal details
- Born: Dublin, Ireland
- Education: University College Dublin

Patrick Kennedy is the Governor of the Bank of Ireland. He took over the role on 31 July 2018 after Archie Kane retired. Patrick Kennedy had previously served as the deputy governor of the bank since 2015. After school in Gonzaga College, he graduated from University College Dublin, and qualified as a Chartered Accountant.

Kennedy is also chairman of CarTrawler and Honorary Treasurer of the Irish Rugby Football Union. After working with KPMG Corporate Finance and McKinsey & Company, he served Greencore Group plc for seven years as Chief Financial Officer. He subsequently joined Paddy Power plc as a non-executive director in 2004, and was their chief executive from 2006 to 2014. He also served as a non-executive director of Elan Corporation plc.

Patrick Kennedy joined Bank of Ireland in 2010 as a non-executive director, and became the deputy governor of the bank in 2015. He also chaired its Risk Committee from 2016 to 2018.
