= Murder of Caroline Glachan =

1996 murder in West Dunbartonshire, Scotland

Caroline Glachan
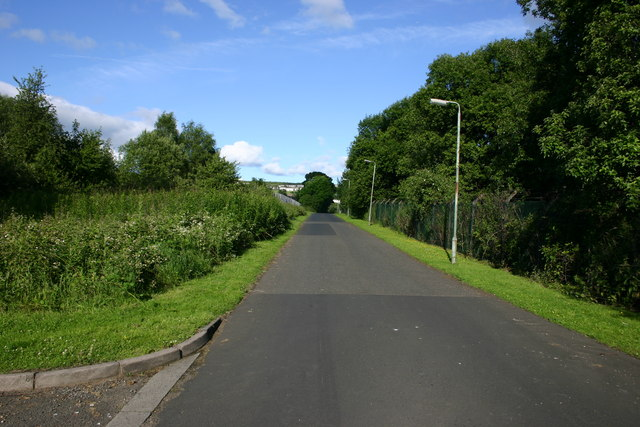
- Dillichip Loan, where Glachan was last seen.
- Born: 8 January 1982; Altnagelvin Area Hospital, Derry, Northern Ireland
- Died: 25 August 1996 (aged 14); Vale of Leven, West Dunbartonshire, Scotland
- Cause of death: Murder
- Parent(s): William Glachan; Margaret Glachan

On 25 August 1996, Caroline Glachan, a fourteen-year-old Scottish girl, was found murdered in the River Leven in West Dunbartonshire, Scotland. The case was unsolved for 27 years until the conviction of three people in 2023.

== Background ==
Glachan was born in Derry, Northern Ireland. She was an only child. At the time of her death, she was a fourth-year pupil at Our Lady and St Patrick's High School in Dumbarton.

== Murder ==
Glachan lived in Bonhill. On the night of 24 August, Glachan planned to meet her boyfriend at a bridge after being cautioned against this by her best friend. Caroline was last seen as she walked along Dillichip Loan to a friend's house from shops on the Ladyton estate in Bonhill after spending the evening with friends. She was walking towards Dillichip Bridge and then on to the river towpath as a shortcut.

Her partly submerged body was found in the River Leven, near Place of Bonhill in Renton the following day by a passer-by. She was found with extensive injuries to her scalp, face and neck sustained from blunt force trauma. The day her body was discovered by police was on her mother's 40th birthday. A pathologist found that ten "significant blows" to the head had rendered her unconscious before she went into the river. A group of teenagers verbally abused her and repeatedly kicked and punched her on the head and body using a blunt instrument of some kind. The cause of death was considered to be drowning.

Glachan's funeral was held on 26 February 1997 in Alexandria.

== Investigation ==
The prime suspect was her boyfriend at the time, Robert O'Brien. A taxi driver who knew Caroline witnessed a hooded figure farther down the street, walking about 30 yards behind her. One key witness was a four-year-old boy. He had claimed witnessing a girl fall into the river.

In September 2006, a £15,000 reward was offered for information. In 2015, a further appeal was made by Police Scotland.

== Media coverage ==
On 5 September 2016, the case featured on BBC Crimewatch. This followed the original appeal on the programme on 10 December 1996.

The case has appeared on STV's Unsolved and CBS's Donal MacIntyre: Unsolved.

== Trial ==
In November 2021, three people were charged with the murder of Caroline Glachan. The trial began at the High Court in Glasgow in November 2023, with the prosecution led by Senior Advocate Depute Alex Prentice. On 14 December 2023, Robert O'Brien, aged 45, Andrew Kelly, 44, and Donna Marie Brand, also aged 44, were convicted of Glachan's murder at the High Court in Glasgow. All three had been teenagers at the time the crime was committed. A fourth suspect, Sarah Jane O'Neil, died before she was able to be charged. In January 2024, the three were sentenced to life in prison, with O'Brien eligible for parole after 22 years, Kelly after 18 years and Brand after 17 years.

In February 2025 the BBC broadcast the documentary Murder Trial: Girl in the River about the trial.

On 26 August 2026, Donna Marie Brand died in prison.

== See also ==
- List of unsolved murders in the United Kingdom
