= Murders of Una Lynskey and Martin Kerrigan =

1971 murders in Ireland

Una Lynskey disappeared on 12 October 1971, while walking the short distance from the bus stop to her rural home in Ratoath, County Meath, Ireland. At 5:30 p.m., she left work from the Office of the Land Commission. She then boarded a bus in Busarás; both Una Lynskey and her cousin got off the bus at 6:55 p.m. Her body was found two months later, close to the village of Glencullen in the Wicklow Mountains.

RTÉ reported that Martin Conmey, Dick Donnelly, and Martin Kerrigan were questioned by gardaí. Reports said that screams were heard close to Porterstown Bridge in that evening. Martin Kerrigan was later abducted and killed by Una Lynskey's brothers Sean and James Lynskey and her cousin John Gaughan, nine days after Una Lynskey's body was discovered. Afterwards, Martin Kerrigan's body was found in Rathfarnham, Dublin, which is close to the site where Una Lynskey was found.

Dick Donnelly won an appeal against his conviction in 1973, but Martin Conmey's conviction was upheld, and he served three years in jail. In November 2010, the Court of Criminal Appeal overturned Martin Conmey's conviction. The Court of Criminal Appeal reported that "there was no incriminating evidence that Mr Conmey was involved in a joint enterprise."
