= Death of Niall Molloy =

Catholic priest who was killed in mysterious circumstances in Ireland

Father Niall Molloy (14 April 1933 – 8 July 1985) was a Catholic priest who was killed in mysterious circumstances in Kilcoursey House in Clara, County Offaly, the home of Richard and Therese Flynn. When the Garda Síochána arrived, they found that there were signs of violence in Flynn's bedroom and that there was a large bloodstain on the carpet. The priest died the day after the wedding of the Flynns' daughter Maureen. Richard Flynn was charged with manslaughter and with actual bodily harm, but, at his trial, Judge Frank Roe (a family friend), directed the jury to give a not guilty verdict. In 2011, a medical examination of brain tissue kept after the original post-mortem revealed that there was a high probability that the priest was alive up to six hours after the initial attack and therefore might have lived if medical help had been summoned. Molloy was parish priest of Castlecoote, County Roscommon at the time of his death.

== Trial of Richard Flynn ==
During Richard Flynn's trial, the defence said that it was possible that Father Molloy had died from heart failure, this led Judge Frank Roe---a "great friend" of the families involved---to direct the jury less than four hours after the hearing began to return a verdict of not guilty. Subsequent to the trial, a coroner's inquest found that Father Molloy had died from a "subdural haemorrhage consistent with having sustained a serious injury to the head".

== Connections with Flynn family ==
Fr. Niall Molloy was originally from County Roscommon. He had been friends with Therese Flynn since childhood, and they had shared an interest in horses. In the 1960s, Father Molloy inherited IR£60,000 from his father, which he used to start in business. He had been business partners with Therese Flynn and they had owned horses and land jointly. Father Molloy had a room in Kilcoursey House, the house owned by the Flynns.

== Files on case ==
The Director of Public Prosecutions' case files on this death were among other files stolen by "The General", Martin Cahill. Details from the files were later published by Veronica Guerin in The Sunday Independent, revealing a possible conflict of interest by the presiding judge in the trial of Richard Flynn.

== Later developments ==
In 2010, two people were questioned in relation to the death of Father Molloy.

In 2011, new medical evidence claimed that several hours passed between the fatal injury and help being sought. In 2012, Gardaí confirmed that members of the National Bureau of Criminal Investigation were investigating the priest's death as the result of new evidence. Valuable items belonging to the priest, including several paintings and a horse vanished after his death. It also emerged that the judge had known the defendant in the trial and should not have heard the trial. The Molloy family do not believe that Richard Flynn killed Father Molloy.

In 2013, the Director of Public Prosecutions finished a review of a Garda investigation into the killing and announced that no charges would be brought. His family have said that they will press for a commission of inquiry into his death.

In 2022, an investigation by RTÉ Investigates found an account of the incident written by Flynn which was not available to the prosecution at the time of the trial.

== See also ==
- Gemma O'Doherty
- List of unsolved murders (1980–1999)
