= Charles Self =

Scottish murder victim

Coordinates: 53.29485°N 6.15631°W

Charles Self (14 February 1949 – 21 January 1982) was a Scottish gay man who was attacked and killed at his home in Monkstown, Dublin in Ireland in a brutal attack in January 1982.

== Early life ==
Charles 'Charlie' Self was born in England, on 14 February 1949, and his mother died when he was quite young. Some friends in Dublin believed he was adopted. Some had met his parents when they visited him and his father, who was in the military, may have remarried. He was mainly raised by an aunt in Glasgow and was on good terms with his family.

== Career ==
Self had worked at the BBC, but was persuaded to work at the Irish broadcaster Raidió Teilifís Éireann by RTÉ's head of design, Alpho O'Reilly. Self relocated to Dublin in 1978 and moved into Annesley Mews on Brighton Avenue in Monkstown. He shared the mews with broadcaster Vincent Hanley.

He was the main set designer for The Late Late Show and worked on a popular Christmas television special with the entertainer Twink, and was due to have a wage increase.

== Murder ==
=== Last known movements ===
On 20 January 1982, Self met with friends for a drink at lunchtime in The Bailey pub on Duke Street in Dublin. Afterwards he walked with a friend along Dawson Street before he headed to RTÉ.

After work he went home, then at 8.30 that evening he was given a lift into the city centre by a passing motorist after waiting at a bus stop. He was seen in The Bailey pub again at around 8.30 pm, leaving at about 9 pm. He was then seen in the South William public house where he remained until around 10.30 pm. He went to another pub, the gay-friendly Bartley Dunne's pub on Stephen Street Lower, where he remained until closing time. He then went down Grafton Street and D'Olier Street to Burgh Quay, where he entered a late-light restaurant called the Hot Pot Cafe at 11.40 pm to buy take-away food, then left at 12:05 am.

He was with a fair-haired man in a two-piece suit when they got into a taxi at 12.20 am. The taximan said his passengers became amorous in the back seat and he left them at Annesley Mews at 12.40, a time confirmed by a garda on 24-hour duty outside a judge's house nearby.

Vincent Hanley appears not to have been at the mews that night, but another RTÉ set designer, Bertram 'Bertie' Tyrer was staying in Hanley's room rather than returning to his cottage in County Wicklow.

=== Discovery of murder ===
Bertie Tyrer came down stairs at 8.45 am and found Self's body lying in a pool of blood, partly slumped against the front door. He had been stabbed 14 times and there were three slash wounds to his throat. Part of the cord from a red dressing gown belonging to Vincent Hanley was also wound tightly around his neck. Tyler tried to use the phone, but could not get a dial tone, so he rang Dún Laoghaire Garda station from the neighbouring mews.

== Funeral ==
His funeral was held in St. Andrews' Presbyterian Church in Blackrock.

== Aftermath ==
Along with the murder of Declan Flynn, the murder of Charles Self motivated LGBT activists to protest against Gardaí getting information on gay men through intimidation. It had a profound impact on the LGBT community.

== Status of case ==
In 2008, a review of the case was conducted by Garda Detective Alan Bailey. He concluded that the murder scene may have been "staged" by the killer to divert attention from himself. As of 2022, the case was still open.
