= Murder of Irene White =

Contract killing of an Irish woman in 2005

- Irene White
- Date: 6 April 2005
- Location: Dundalk, Ireland; 54.006258°N 6.4077776°W
- Cause: Stabbing
- Deaths: Irene White (aged 43 years)
- Convicted: Anthony Lambe (2018), Niall Power (2019)
- Charges: Murder
- Sentence: Life in prison

Irene White was an Irish mother-of-three who was stabbed to death at her house in Dundalk in 2005. Investigations later revealed that her death was the result of a contract killing, rather than a burglary gone wrong or a random attack. The dramatic circumstances of White's murder caused widespread outrage in Ireland, where non-gangland related violent crime is a rare occurrence. Two men were later sentenced to life in prison for her murder, however speculation around their motives and the identity of who ultimately ordered White's killing continues to the present day.

== Background ==
Born in 1961 near Omeath, Irene White was living in Dundalk, County Louth and working part-time at a security company around the time of her murder. White had separated from her husband six months before her death, and lived with her three children in an art deco-style building know locally as the Ice House. White's 70-year-old mother also lived in a caravan at the rear of the property. Three weeks before she was murdered, White allegedly told a close friend she was living in fear of a named individual, and that she also believed she was under surveillance by unknown persons.

== Murder and aftermath ==
On the morning of Wednesday 6 April 2005, White dropped off her children to school as normal and returned home shortly before 10am. A local woman out walking in neighboring Ice House Hill park noticed a suspicious looking man running across the park around 10:15am. Shortly before 12:30pm, White's mother noticed that the back door of the house was open, and on entering found her daughter laying dead in a pool of blood on the kitchen floor. White had suffered a total of 34 stab wounds, including 15 times to the front and 14 times in her back, and she also had her throat slashed open. Garda examination of the crime scene found no evidence of forced entry and nothing of value had been stolen. Bloody footprints were observed leading from White's body out the front door of the house and over a wall into the adjacent Ice House Hill park. White was wearing rubber gloves when she was attacked, which collected fibers and DNA as she grappled with her killer, thus allowing forensic evidence to be recovered by Garda technical officers.

Although White had previously had extra security devices installed at her house, Gardaí discovered that the rear security gate was broken and CCTV cameras around the building had been disabled. A few days after the murder, White's mother and her eldest daughter were granted an interim injunction at the High Court against White's estranged husband, preventing him from selling the Ice House and also barring him from entering the property. The temporary order was lifted by consent of all parties several weeks later.

In May 2005, the Gardaí made a public appeal to identify a man who was seen running through Ice House Hill park at 10:15am on the morning of the murder. He was witnessed to have then entered a dark coloured car at the nearby O’Hanlon Park housing estate, before driving off towards the Castletown Road area of the town. Detectives working on the case also reportedly investigated if White's murder was a pre-planned contract killing rather than a random attack by a stranger. Although the fact nothing was stolen ruled out the theory of a burglar being disturbed, the shear ferocity of the injuries White sustained indicated to authorities that her death was not the characteristic work of a professional killer.

== Garda investigation ==
Gardaí quickly identified two persons of interest who they suspected organized White's murder, and obtained data regarding all telephone calls and texts sent in the Dundalk area on the morning of the murder in an effort to identify persons who were in contact with them. Gardaí also discovered that White had been in a dispute with her estranged husband regarding the proposed sale of the Ice House, which she had blocked, to a company wishing to demolish it and then expand their existing site.

In 2006, Irene White's estranged husband Alan White and 34-year-old security firm owner Niall Power were arrested in the Dundalk area on suspicion of withholding information regarding White's murder the previous year. Alan White was later released without charge after reportedly answering all questions and cooperating fully with investigators. Gardaí confronted Power with CCTV footage of him driving past the crime scene an hour before White's body was discovered, and accused him of checking if the alarm had been raised after being informed by the killer that the "job was done”. The fact that Power had previously given several statements on his movements on the morning in question, but had omitted that he drove past the Ice House at times relevant to the murder inquiry, was deemed highly suspicious to the investigating officers. It was also discovered that Power was supposed to travel to Dublin for a business conference in Citywest with Alan White that morning, but had abruptly cancelled his attendance without explanation. Power mostly remained silent during questioning and was released without charge. It was later reported that Power's ex-girlfriend had previously warned Irene White that Power and another person had been plotting to have her killed, and she had also given detailed statements to Gardaí in the aftermath of White's murder regarding allegedly overhearing the two men's incriminating conversations.

By April 2007, Gardaí had interviewed around 2000 people and recorded over 700 witness statements, however they had still not identified the person seen running from the crime scene or gathered enough evidence to file charges against persons of interest. In 2009, White's sister Anne Delcassian claimed Irene's life had been threatened several months before her murder, and that the person making the threat claimed they would "have an alibi" whenever she was murdered. In May 2010, a doorman living in Drogheda contacted Gardaí to claim he was offered €35,000 to kill an unnamed woman in County Louth shortly before White's murder.

== SCRT breakthrough ==
On 15 April 2013, an anonymous female caller contacted the Serious Crime Review Team offices in Harcourt Square from a payphone in Australia. The woman claimed that a friend of hers, 30-year-old Anthony Lambe, had confessed to her in December 2005 that he had murdered Irene White. Enquiries revealed that Lambe had previously been interviewed several times by Gardaí in relation to White's murder, although not as a suspect, as his then employer Niall Power had made a statement that he had met Lambe on the day in question to pay him an advance on his wages. The same anonymous caller rang the SCRT three days later with more information, detailing how Lambe described having been paid by another person to carry out the murder on their behalf.

Investigating officers thereafter interviewed Lambe's girlfriend at the time of the murder, who told them she remembered the exact day Irene White was killed as she had flown to England with Lambe for her graduation ceremony that afternoon. She remarked that Lambe seemed jittery and agitated on that day, and he was also carrying an unusually large amount of cash. When Gardaí reviewed their interview notes with Lambe from 2006, they discovered he had claimed to have been shopping for trousers near his home in Castleblaney on the morning of White's murder. However, cell site analysis proved his mobile phone was active in the Dundalk area around that time. A second witness also contacted the officers to inform them that Lambe had remarked “I done that” when a news report about White's murder had appeared on T.V. in a Dundalk pub.

== Arrest and conviction of murderer ==
On the morning of 20 January 2017, Anthony Lambe was arrested at his parents house in County Monaghan and brought to Dundalk garda station for interrogation. In the presence of his lawyer, Lambe immediately confessed to having committed White's murder in 2005. Lambe described how he was drinking heavily and taking recreational drugs (including cocaine and ecstasy) on a near daily basis around the time of the murder, and began working for PPS Security as a doorman to earn additional money while at college. The owner of the firm, Niall Power, often gave him extra cash on top of his wages to fund his lifestyle. Lambe claimed that in December 2004, Power asked him to kill Irene White in return for his debts being written off and a further €4,000 in cash.

Lambe went onto describe how Power allegedly gave him details on the times White would be alone in the house and helped him to perform reconnaissance of the adjacent park beside her house. Phone records also proved that the two men were in contact around the time White arrived home from the school run. According to Lambe, after first parking his car in the nearby O’Hanlon Park housing estate, he then snorted a line of cocaine and walked through Ice House Hill park, before jumping a wall into the back garden of White's house. Lambe then knocked on the back door, and when White opened it he attacked her with a long bladed knife that Power had allegedly provided him with. After killing White, he then escaped back into the neighboring park and drove home to his parents house in Monaghan to dispose of his blood stained clothes. Lambe claimed he returned to Dundalk later that morning to receive €1,000 from Power, and analysis of bank statements would later prove that Power had made a withdrawal of that amount at 10:41am on the day in question from his own bank account.

On 29 January 2018, Anthony Lambe was sentenced to life in prison after pleading guilty to the murder of Irene White. Lambe had previously described to the court how he was intoxicated on a cocktail of alcohol, ecstasy and cocaine at the time of the murder, and had gone into a frenzy when White did not die immediately after he stabbed her in the chest. Lambe also claimed to have suffered from regular nightmares since the murder, and had twice attempted suicide due to the guilt of having killed White.

== Confession of accomplice ==
The day after Lambe was sentenced, Niall Power walked into Dundalk Garda station and confessed to being the middleman in the murder of Irene White. Power claimed another man had asked him in 2003 to kill White, and he had arranged for his employee Anthony Lambe to carry out the murder on his behalf. As his company was responsible for providing security at White's house, Power arranged for the security gate at the rear of the property to be sabotaged so Lambe could gain entry. Power asserted that on the day of the murder, the other man was in his presence when Lambe called to confirm he had carried out the killing, and subsequent telecommunications analysis by the Garda supported Power's accusation. On 11 July 2019, Niall Power was sentenced to life in prison after pleading guilty to arranging the murder of Irene White. During sentencing, it was revealed that Power was once a close family friend who was well known to White. In January 2025, Power appealed to quash his conviction on the grounds that he was “suffering a mental breakdown” at the time of his confession.

== Subsequent developments ==
In late 2019, it was reported that Gardaí were in the final stages of compiling evidence to charge the alleged "mastermind" with soliciting Lambe and Power to carry out the murder of White, with the hope that the two men would testify against him at trial. However, in November 2023 it was reported that the Director of Public Prosecutions had declined to file charges against the man suspected of ordering White's death, despite Gardaí recommending that he be charged with murder. Both Lambe and Power had refused to give evidence against the prime suspect, allegedly out of fear of reprisals from within the Irish prison system. Lawyers acting on behalf of White's family released a statement expressing deep disappointment over the decision, adding that the launching of civil proceedings for unlawful killing against the suspect were being considered.
