= Murder of Sinéad Kelly =

1998 murder in Ireland

Sinéad Kelly was an Irish sex worker who was murdered in an alleged contract killing in Dublin city on 22 June 1998. As of 2026, her murder remains unsolved.

== Background ==
Kelly was 21 years old at the time of her death. She was from Santry in Dublin and worked as a prostitute to earn money to fund her heroin addiction. Despite her addiction, the toxicology tests performed following her death determined she only had prescription drugs in her system when she died.

She had successfully overcome addiction once before, following treatment. However, she relapsed into addiction and returned to prostitution following a stabbing and rape which occurred on a night out with a friend.

== Death ==
At 12.30 am on 22 June 1998, at Herbert Place on the banks of the Grand Canal in Dublin, a witness heard a woman scream "God someone help, someone please, please help me". Gardaí (police) were called and Sinéad Kelly was found dead. It was determined later that she died after being stabbed 18 times to her head, neck, chest, and back. The same witness reported seeing a man jog away from the scene. He was reported to be a well-built man wearing a tight black leather jacket which had a buckle on the left shoulder. He also wore dark jeans and a knitted wool hat.

== Investigation ==
Gardaí believe Kelly was lured to her death and that the murder may be linked to a drug debt she owed to a heroin dealer. Rosie Lakes, a heroin addict and prostitute, alleged that she was given heroin from her and Kelly's dealer in exchange for pointing Kelly out to this dealer's associates. Lakes was the state's only witness in Kelly's murder and the recommendation by the Director of Public Prosecutions that these men be charged was dropped following the death of Rosie Lakes from tainted heroin.

Two men were arrested early in the investigation, including one man reportedly linked to a crime family based in Crumlin in Dublin, but both were released without charge. A man from Dublin was also questioned about her murder in Kensington, London.

Gardaí linked the murder to another attack on a prostitute which took place in September 1998 in Dublin. During this attack, a 28-year-old woman was stabbed with a Stanley knife on Benburb Street, a noted area for prostitution in Dublin at the time. Gardaí believe the same drug dealing gang that killed Kelly targeted this woman as she could potentially help Gardaí investigate her murder.

In 2017, a Garda informant implicated an unnamed suspect in Kelly's murder in the disappearance of Trevor Deely in Dublin in December 2000.

== Media reaction ==
Following her murder and the subsequent attack on the unnamed 28-year-old woman, media in Ireland were said to have "label[led]" Kelly. The Irish Independent wrote about the sex trade following the murder, describing prostitutes in the area of the attack as 'junkies'. The Sunday World referred to Sinéad Kelly as a 'teen hooker' despite her being 21-years-old at the time of her murder.

== Impact ==
Following the murder, there was criticism of some aspects of the Criminal Law (Sexual Offences) Act 1993. The act, which prohibited solicitation or importuning for purposes of prostitution as well as loitering for purposes of prostitution, was criticised in the March 1999 issue of the Workers Solidarity Movement's newspaper, Workers Solidarity, which stated that the anti-soliciting laws had made Sinéad Kelly "an easy target".

Writing in the Irish Independent, journalist Bruce Arnold discussed Kelly's murder and described the 1993 act as "draconian" while calling on the Irish government to protect prostitutes better.

In 2017, Ireland passed the Criminal Law (Sexual Offences) Act 2017 which decriminalised prostitution, but criminalised the purchases of sex, following the Nordic model approach to prostitution.

== See also ==
- List of unsolved murders (1980–1999)
