= Tiger kidnapping =

Type of kidnapping

A tiger kidnapping or tiger robbery involves two separate crimes. The first crime usually involves an abduction of a valuable person or thing. Instead of demanding money, the captors demand that a second crime be committed on their behalf. The second crime could be anything from robbery to a murder to the planting of a bomb. A person or item held hostage is kept by the captors until their demands are met. The goal of the captors is to have their risky/dirty work performed by another person. The victims of a crime like this are less likely to report to authorities since they just committed a crime themselves.

== Origins ==
The practice began as a twist on a tactic used by the Irish Republican Army, which kidnapped people in order to coerce others into placing car bombs. The term originated from the similar way that criminals observe and "stalk their prey before pouncing".

The first recorded crime that can be described as a tiger kidnapping occurred in 1972, but the term was coined in the 1980s and gained more widespread use in the following decade. Since tiger kidnapping is technically two crimes committed in tandem, statistics regarding their occurrence are difficult to compile. Tiger kidnappings have occurred in several jurisdictions, but are more common in the United Kingdom, Ireland, and Belgium. Examples include the Northern Bank robbery and Bank of Ireland robbery. According to International Herald Tribune, tiger kidnappings "have become common in Ireland, a close-knit society where criminals can closely track their targets" and "they have typically involved thefts below €1 million." After the 2009 Bank of Ireland robbery, Charlie Flanagan, a member of the Irish Parliament, remarked that “tiger kidnappings are taking place in Ireland... at a rate of almost one per week.”

== Countermeasures ==
Businesses can take several steps to guard against these such as mandating that two or more people must work in tandem in order to open sensitive areas such as bank vaults and cash boxes.

== In popular culture ==
The movies Cash on Demand, Nick of Time, Bandits, Firewall, Intermission and Waist Deep dramatize tiger kidnappings.

The video game Phoenix Wright: Ace Attorney − Justice for All features a tiger kidnapping as a plot point in its final case.

The 2002 video game The Getaway plot revolves around the tiger kidnapping of one of the game's protagonists' son.

A tiger kidnapping is also carried out in Season 4 of Love/Hate.

The series Happy Valley features a kidnapping that is falsely described as a tiger kidnapping by Sergeant Cawood.

Vera series 11, episode 3 "Tyger, tyger" revolves around a kidnapping which instigates a smuggling crime through the Port of Tyne.

== See also ==
- Duress
- Murder of Brian Wells
