= Murder of Patricia O'Connor =

2017 murder in Dublin, Ireland

The murder of Patricia O'Connor (19 May 1956 – 29 May 2017) occurred in Dublin. Patricia O'Connor was an Irish woman whose dismembered remains were found scattered along a road in the Wicklow Mountains in June 2017. Several members of her family were subsequently convicted of concealing her murder by Kieran Greene.

== The victim ==
Patricia O'Connor was a former hospital worker who lived in Rathfarnham, Dublin. She lived with her husband Augustine ('Gus'), their daughter Louise, Louise's partner Kieran Greene and their three young children, as well as Louise’s two older children from a previous relationship with Keith Johnston.

== Events ==
=== Discovery of remains ===
On Saturday 10 June at about 19:45 IST two walkers on the Military Road near Enniskerry found human remains. The remains found were a torso and Bray Garda station began investigating. Some 30 km of roads in Wicklow were closed off during the search.

The Garda Water Unit discovered remains near the Glenmacnass Waterfall near to where they had previously found remains. Defence Forces personnel also found remains near Lough Brea Lower.

On Tuesday 13 June a bag containing the head and hands of the deceased were found and limbs were also discovered. Gardaí confirmed the remains are those of an adult woman. A man in his thirties was arrested in Wexford in connection with the remains.

On Wednesday 14 June the deceased was named locally as Patricia O'Connor, a 61 year old resident of Rathfarnham who was reported missing on the second of June.

Her remains were found scattered across 15 locations in the Wicklow Mountains.

=== Garda announcement ===
Gardaí believe that she was killed with a blow from a blunt instrument at the end of May during a row in Rathfarnham. They also believe that her remains were dismembered in a field outside Kilmuckridge and buried there in a shallow grave for two days before being disinterred and scattered along the Military Road in Wicklow.

=== Charges brought ===
On Thursday 15 June Kieran Greene, a 32-year-old man from Rathfarnham was charged with O'Connor’s murder at Tallaght District Court. He was arrested that morning at Bray Garda station and when charged claimed "it was self defence". Justice Patricia McNamara remanded him to appear at Cloverhill Court the following Thursday.

On Thursday 22 June Kieran Greene was charged with the murder and appeared in court via videolink. He spoke only to confirm his name and that he could see the court. Detective Garda David Connolly said they needed formal directions from the Director of Public Prosecutions. Judge Victor Blake remanded Greene to appear in court via videolink four weeks later.

On Saturday 2 September a 73-year-old man was arrested in County Meath and two women, aged 19 and 38 were arrested in Dublin. They were held in Bray and Wicklow Garda stations. They were released the following day.

On Tuesday 26 September a 40-year-old man was arrested in Dublin and was held at Bray Garda station.

In October 2018 Augustine O'Connor (Patricia O'Connor's husband) Louise O'Connor (her daughter), Louise's ex-partner Keith Johnson and Louise's daughter Stephanie were charged with impeding the investigation into Patricia O'Connor's murder.

== Trial ==
On 15 January 2020 Kieran Greene went on trial for the murder of Patricia O'Connor. On 25 February 2020 he was found guilty of murdering his former partner's mother by bludgeoning her in the bathroom of their home.

On 26 February 2020 Stephanie O'Connor was found guilty of impeding the apprehension or prosecution of Greene, knowing or believing him to have murdered her grandmother on 29 May 2017. The jury accepted the prosecution case that she had disguised herself as her grandmother on 29 May 2017 to conceal O'Connor's death.

On 27 February 2020 Louise O'Connor was found guilty of impeding the apprehension or prosecution of Kieran Greene, knowing or believing him to have murdered her mother Patricia O’Connor on May 29, 2017.

On 28 February 2020 Keith Johnston was found guilty of impeding the apprehension or prosecution of Kieran Greene, knowing or believing him to have murdered Patricia O’Connor on May 29, 2017. He had denied assisting Greene in buying DIY tools in Woodie's, Mr Price, B&Q and Shoe Zone, Tallaght on 9 June 2017. The jury accepted the prosecution charge that Johnston knew or suspected that the tools were to be used in the dismemberment of O'Connor’s remains. Johnston was Louise O'Connor’s former partner and father of two of her children, including Stephanie O'Connor.

== Sentencing ==
Sentencing was originally scheduled for 20 April 2020, but because of the COVID-19 pandemic it was postponed. The judge proposed that the sentencing should happen on 22 June and that a victim impact statement be received on that date.

A victim impact statement was read by Patricia's son Richard O'Connor on 22 June 2020. He said that his ability to trust people had been affected and processing the lies to him had caused him sleepless nights. His children had lost their grandmother and she would not be able to pass on her love of gardening, art, baking and nature to them.

In June 2020 Kieran Greene was sentenced to life imprisonment for murdering O'Connor. Stephanie O'Connor was sentenced to 18 months' imprisonment, and her mother Louise was sentenced to 2 and a half years' imprisonment. Keith Johnston was sentenced to 3 years' imprisonment. Augustine O'Connor, who had already pleaded guilty to reporting his wife as a missing person despite knowing she was already dead, was sentenced to 18 months' imprisonment.
