= Bank of Ireland =

Irish commercial bank

Bank of Ireland Group plc
- Type: Public
- Traded as: Euronext Dublin: BIRG; ISEQ 20 component
- ISIN: IE00BD1RP616
- Industry: Banking; Financial services
- Founded: 5 April 1783; 243 years ago
- Headquarters: Upper Baggot St, Dublin, Ireland
- Area served: Ireland; United Kingdom
- Key people: Patrick Kennedy (Governor); Myles O'Grady (CEO)
- Products: Finance and insurance; Retail banking; Corporate banking; Investment banking; Private banking; Mortgages; Credit cards
- Revenue: €7,817 million (2023)
- Operating income: €4,428 million (2023)
- Net income: €1,601 million (2023)
- Total assets: €165 billion (2025)
- Number of employees: 10,845 (2023)
- Website: www.bankofireland.com

Bank of Ireland Group plc (Irish: Banc na hÉireann) is a commercial bank operation in Ireland and one of the traditional Big Four Irish banks. Historically the premier banking organisation in Ireland, the bank occupies a unique position in Irish banking history. At the core of the modern-day group is the old Governor and Company of the Bank of Ireland, the ancient institution established by royal charter in 1783.

Bank of Ireland has been designated as a Significant Institution since the entry into force of European Banking Supervision in late 2014, and as a consequence is directly supervised by the European Central Bank.

== History ==
Bank of Ireland is the oldest bank in continuous operation (apart from closures due to bank strikes in 1950, 1966, 1970, 1976, 1992 and 1992) in Ireland.

Bank of Ireland Act 1781
- Act of Parliament
- Parliament of Ireland
- Long title: An Act for establishing a Bank, by the Name of the Governors and Company of the Bank of Ireland.
- Citation: 21 & 22 Geo. 3. c. 16 (I)
- Territorial extent: Ireland

Dates
- Royal assent: 4 May 1782
- Commencement: 1 August 1782 (Note: Section 1.)
Other legislation
Amended by	Bankers (Ireland) Act 1845; Criminal Statutes Repeal Act 1861

Status: Amended

Text of statute as originally enacted

The Bank of Ireland Act 1781 (21 & 22 Geo. 3. c. 16 (I)) was passed by the Parliament of Ireland, establishing the Bank of Ireland. On 25 June 1783, Bank of Ireland opened for business at St Mary's Abbey in a private house previously owned by one Charles Blakeney.

On 6 June 1808, Bank of Ireland moved to the former Parliament House at 2 College Green. By 1827, it had seven branches outside of Dublin, in Belfast, Clonmel, Cork, Derry, Newry, Waterford and Westport.

In 1864, Bank of Ireland paid its first interest on deposits.

By 1883, Bank of Ireland had 58 branches throughout Ireland, and by 1920, the number had grown to 75.

In 1922, Bank of Ireland was appointed as banker to the Government of Ireland.

In 1926, Bank of Ireland took control of the National Land Bank. In 1948, The Bank of Ireland 1783–1946 by F.G. Hall was published jointly by Hodges Figgis (Dublin) and Blackwell's (Oxford).

In 1958, the bank took over the Hibernian Bank Limited.

In 1965, the National Bank Ltd, a bank founded by Daniel O'Connell in 1835, had branches in Ireland and Britain. The Irish branches were acquired by Bank of Ireland (changing its name to the National Bank of Ireland Ltd), and rebranded temporarily as National Bank of Ireland, before being fully incorporated into Bank of Ireland. The British branches were acquired by Williams & Glyn's Bank.

In 1969, Bank of Ireland, Hibernian Bank and the National Bank of Ireland were merged to form the Bank of Ireland Group.

In 1980, Bank of Ireland opened its first ATM (branded as Pass Machines). In 1983, Bank of Ireland celebrated its Bi-Centenary and a commemorative stamp was issued. The Bank also commissioned the publication of "An Irish Florilegium" that year. Only branches in cities and major towns had ATMs in the 1980s but branches in most medium and small towns installed then in the 1990s.

In 1990, Bank of Ireland offered Visa cards for the first time. In 1995, Bank of Ireland merged First New Hampshire Bank with Royal Bank of Scotland's Citizens Financial Group. In 1996, it introduced telephone banking.

In 1996, Bank of Ireland bought the Bristol and West building society for UK£600 million (€882 million), which kept its own brand. In 1997, Bank of Ireland acquired New Ireland Assurance plc.

In 1997, Bank of Ireland introduced Internet banking.

In 1999, the bank held merger talks with Alliance & Leicester, but they were called off. In 2000, it was announced that Bank of Ireland was acquiring Chase de Vere. This share was later sold in 2004.

In 2001, the bank acquired Moneyextra. In 2002, it acquired a 61% share in Iridian, a US investment manager, which doubled the size of its asset management business. It increased its share to 76% in 2004. In 2005, Bank of Ireland completed the sale of the Bristol and West branch and Direct Savings (Contact Centre) to Britannia Building Society.

In 2008, Moody's Investors Service changed its rating of Bank of Ireland from stable to negative. Moody's pinpointed concerns over weakening asset quality and the impact of a more challenging economic environment on profitability at Bank of Ireland. A share price collapse followed. In 2009, The Irish government announced a €7 billion rescue package for the bank and Allied Irish Banks plc in February. The biggest bank robbery in the history of the state took place at Bank of Ireland at College Green. Consultants Oliver Wyman validated Bank of Ireland's bad debt levels at €6 billion over three years to March 2011, a bad debt level which was exceeded by almost €1 billion within a matter of months.

In 2010, the European Commission ordered the disposal of Bank of Ireland Asset Management, New Ireland Assurance, ICS Building Society, its US Foreign Exchange business and the stakes held in the Irish Credit Bureau and in an American Asset Manager followed the receipt of Irish Government State aid. In 2011, the Securities Services Division of the bank was sold to Northern Trust Corporation.

In 2013, Bank of Ireland more than doubled interest rates on mortgages tracking Bank of England rates, (which had remained stable for four years), citing the need to hold more reserves and the 'increased cost of funding mortgages'. Described by Ray Boulger of broker John Charcol as 'having shot the reputation of its mortgages to smithereens', nevertheless, the bank continues to offer highly competitive mortgages through the Post Office.

In 2014, regulation of the bank was transferred to the European Central Bank. Also in 2014, the bank entered into a marketing alliance with EVO Payments International and re-entered the card acquiring market. BOI Payment Acceptance was launched in December 2014.

In September 2022, the Irish state sold its remaining shareholding in the bank to return it to fully private ownership for the first time in a decade.

In Summer 2025, upgrade of its ATM network for the first time since the 1990s.

=== Role as government banker ===
Bank of Ireland is not, and was never, the Irish central bank. However, as well as being a commercial bank – a deposit-taker and a credit institution – it performed many central bank functions, much like the earlier-established Bank of Scotland and Bank of England. Bank of Ireland operated the Exchequer Account and during the nineteenth century acted as something of a banker of last resort. Even the titles of the chairman of the board of directors (the Governor) and the title of the board itself (the Court of Directors) suggest a central bank status. From the foundation of the Irish Free State in 1922 until 31 December 1971, Bank of Ireland was the banker of the Irish Government.

=== Headquarters ===
Bank of Ireland is headquartered at Baggot Plaza, 27-33 Upper Baggot Street, Dublin 4.

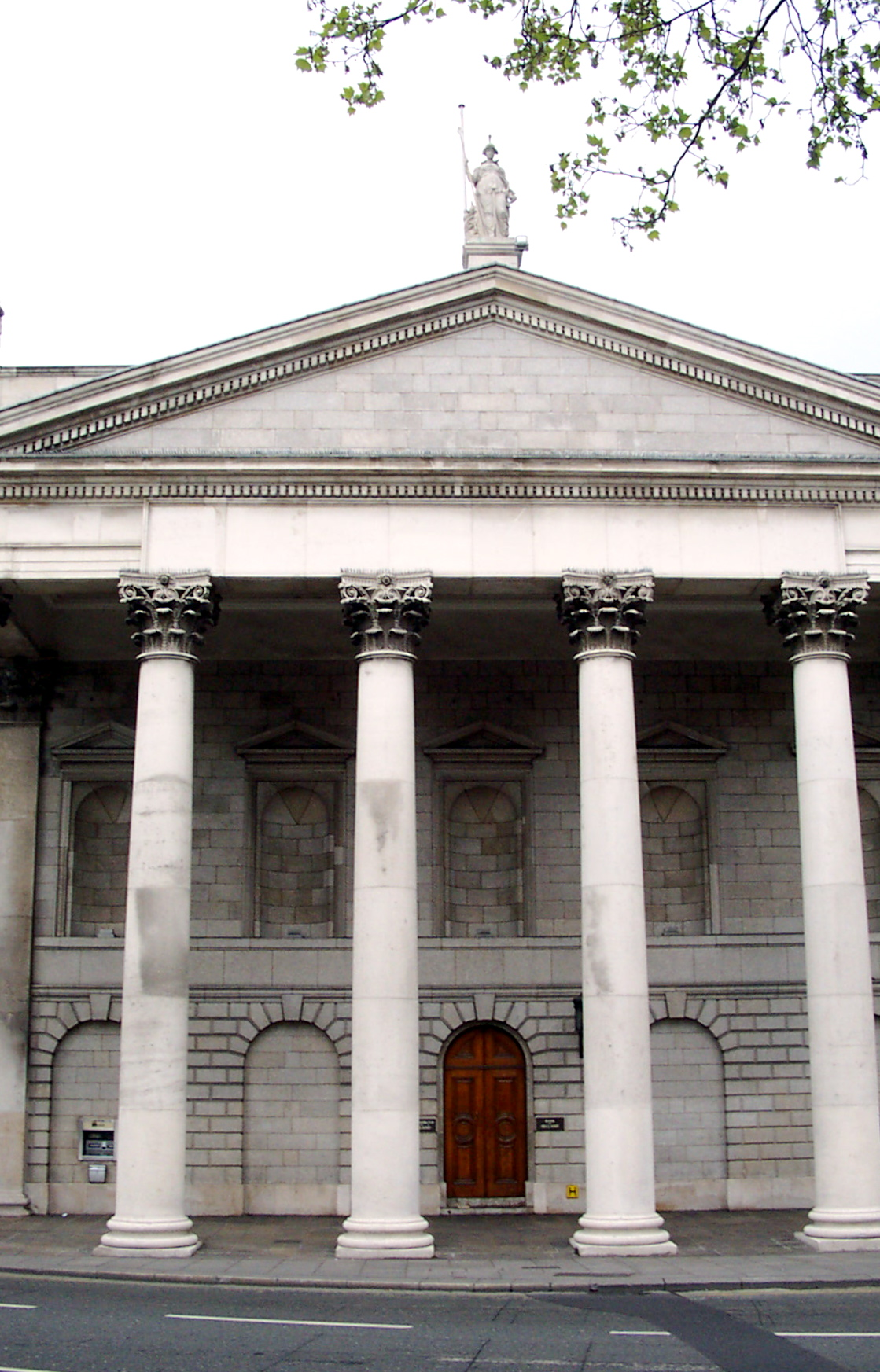
The former House of Lords entrance to Parliament House on Westmoreland Street, Dublin

The headquarters of the bank until the 1970s was the impressive Parliament House on College Green, Dublin. This building was originally designed by Sir Edward Lovett Pearce in 1729 to host the Irish Parliament, and it was the world's first purpose-built bicameral parliament building.

The bank had planned to commission a building designed by Sir John Soane to be constructed on the site bounded by Westmoreland Street, Fleet Street, College Street and D'Olier Street (now occupied by the Westin Hotel). However, the project was cancelled following the Act of Union in 1800, when the newly defunct Parliament House was bought by the Bank of Ireland in 1803. The former Parliament House continues today as a working branch. Today, visitors can still view the impressive Irish House of Lords chamber within the old headquarters building. The Oireachtas, the modern parliament of Ireland, is now housed in Leinster House in Dublin. In 2011, the Irish Government set out proposals to acquire the building as a venue for the state to use as a cultural venue.

In the 1970s the bank moved its headquarters to a modern building, now known as Miesian Plaza, on Lower Baggot Street, Dublin 2. As Frank McDonald notes in his book Destruction of Dublin, when these headquarters were built, it caused the world price of copper to rise – such was the usage in the building.

In 2010 the bank moved to smaller headquarters on Mespil Road. In 2021 the Bank announced they were moving their headquarters again.

== Banking services ==
Bank of Ireland is headquartered at Group Head Office Baggot Plaza 27-33 Upper Baggot St Dublin, and has operations in the Republic of Ireland, Northern Ireland, Great Britain and elsewhere.

=== Republic of Ireland ===
The group provides a broad range of financial services in Ireland to the personal, commercial, industrial and agricultural sectors. These include checking and deposit services, overdrafts, term loans, mortgages, international asset financing, leasing, instalment credit, debt financing, foreign exchange facilities, interest and exchange rate hedging instruments, executor and trustee services.

At its height in 1969, Bank of Ireland had 500 branches in the Republic of Ireland. By 2022, the number of branches had gradually been cut to 169.

=== Northern Ireland ===
In Northern Ireland, Bank of Ireland prints its own banknotes in Pounds Sterling (see section on banknotes below).

In 2021, the number of branches in Northern Ireland was cut from 28 to 13.

=== Great Britain ===
In Great Britain, the bank expanded largely through the takeover of the Bristol and West Building Society in 1996. Bank of Ireland also provides Post Office branded savings accounts throughout the UK. The bank previously offered Post Office mortgages and personal loans, as well as AA branded savings and personal loans, but withdrew these products in 2023.

=== Rest of world ===
Operations in the rest of the world are primarily undertaken by Bank of Ireland Corporate Banking which provides services in France, Germany, Spain and the United States.

== Banknotes ==
A UK£5 sterling note issued by Bank of Ireland in Northern Ireland

Although the Bank of Ireland is not a central bank, it does have sterling note-issuing rights in the United Kingdom. While the Bank has its headquarters in Dublin, it also has operations in Northern Ireland, where it retains the legal right (dating from before the partition of Ireland) to print its own banknotes. These are pound sterling notes and equal in value to Bank of England notes, and should not be confused with banknotes of the former Irish pound.

The obverse side of Bank of Ireland banknotes features the Bank of Ireland logo, below which is a line of heraldic shields each representing one of the six counties of Northern Ireland. Below this is a depiction of a seated Hibernia figure, surrounded by the Latin motto of the Bank, Bona Fides Reipublicae Stabilitas ("Good Faith is the Cornerstone of the State"). The current series of £5, £10 and £20 notes, issued in April 2008, all feature an illustration of the Old Bushmills Distillery on the reverse side. Prior to 2008, all Bank of Ireland notes featured an image of the Queen's University of Belfast on the reverse side.

The principal difference between the denominations is their colour and size:

- £5 note, blue
- £10 note, pink
- £20 note, green
- £50 note, blue-green
- £100 note, red.

The Bank of Ireland has never issued its own banknotes in the Republic of Ireland. Section 60 of the Currency Act 1927 removed the right of Irish banks to issue banknotes, however "consolidated banknotes", of a common design issued by all "Shareholder Banks" under the Act, were issued between 1929 and 1953. These notes were not legal tender.

== Controversies ==
=== Michael Soden ===
Michael Soden abruptly quit as group chief executive on 29 May 2004 when it was discovered that adult material that contravened company policy was found on his Bank PC. Soden issued a personal statement explaining that the high standards of integrity and behaviour in an environment of accountability, transparency and openness, which he espoused, would cause embarrassment to the Bank.

=== DIRT controversy ===
A IR£30.5 million tax arrears liability was settled by Bank of Ireland in July 2000. The Bank told the Oireachtas Public Accounts Committee Inquiry that its liability was in the region of £1.5 million. The settlement figure was 'dictated' by the Revenue Commissioners following an audit by the Commissioners. It was in Bank of Ireland that some of the most celebrated of the "celebrated cases" of non-compliance and bogus non-resident accounts have to date been discovered and disclosed. Thurles, Boyle, Roscrea (1990), Milltown Malbay (1991), Dundalk (1989–90), Killester (1992), Tullamore (1993), Mullingar (1996), Castlecomer, Clonmel, Ballybricken, Ballinasloe, Skibbereen (1988), Dungarvan and, disclosed to the Oireachtas Public Accounts Sub-Committee, Ballaghaderreen (1998) and Ballygar (1999). The Public Accounts Sub-Committee Inquiry concluded that "the most senior executives in the Bank of Ireland did seek to set an ethical tone for the bank and unsuccessfully sought Revenue Commissioners assistance to promote an industry-wide Code of Practice".

=== Stolen laptops ===
In April 2008 it was announced that four laptops with data pertaining to 10,000 customers were stolen between June and October 2007. This customer information included names, addresses, bank details, medical and pension details.

The thefts were initially reported to the Garda Síochána, however the Banks senior management did not know about the problem until February 2008 after an internal audit uncovered the theft and the Bank did not advise the Data Protection Commissioner and the Central Bank of Ireland until mid-April 2008. It also came to light that none of the laptops used encryption to protect the sensitive data. The Bank has since released a press release detailing the seven branches affected and its initial response, later in the month the Bank confirmed that 31,500 customer records were affected as well as an increased number of branches.

=== Record bank robbery ===
On 27 February 2009, it was reported that a criminal gang from Dublin had stolen €7 million from the Bank of Ireland's main branch in College Green. The robbery was the biggest in the history of Ireland, during which the girlfriend of an employee, her mother and her mother's five-year-old granddaughter were held hostage at gunpoint. Gardaí arrested six men the next day, and recovered €1.8 million. A spokesperson for the bank said: "Bank of Ireland's priority is for the safety and well-being of the staff member and the family involved in this incident and all of the bank's support services have been made available to them."

=== Wrong information on recapitalisation and bonuses ===
The information provided to the Department of Finance in 2009 in advance of a recapitalisation of the bank which cost the taxpayer €3.5 billion "was incomplete and misleading". It also gave wrong information to the Minister for Finance who in turn misled the Dáil on €66 million in bonuses it paid since receiving a State guarantee. External examiners found it used "a restrictive and uncommon interpretation of what constituted a performance bonus". Their report also found that there had been "a catalogue of errors" and that the information supplied by Bank of Ireland to the Department of Finance was "presented in a manner which minimised the level of additional payments made". The Bank paid €2 million by way of compensation to the Exchequer for providing "misleading" information.

=== Relationship with outsourcing companies ===
The Bank has forged strong links with IT outsourcing companies since 2004 or earlier. On 1 November 2010, IBM won the $450M full scope outsource contract to manage BoI Group's Information Technology (IT) infrastructure services (e.g. mainframe, servers, desktops and print services) in a competitive bid against HP (the incumbent outsource provider) and HCL. This follows on from the Bank's natural expiration of its current agreement with HP, which was signed in 2004.

Following a competitive bid process with a number of parties, IBM was selected for exclusive contract negotiations in July 2011. During the intervening period, an extensive due diligence phase has been undertaken and relevant regulatory approval has been granted. IBM will manage the group's entire IT infrastructure, including desktop systems, servers, mainframes, local area networks and service desk. Since then, BOI has given HCL a €30m Business Process Outsourcing contract and has selected them as strategic local resourcing partner in Ireland. In addition to that, HCL have opened a software factory for Bank of Ireland in India and has started to outsource production support for the retail banking and payments applications in BOI. This exclusive relationship with HCL has been seen as controversial in the context of the substantial Irish taxpayer investment in Bank of Ireland – and the lack of any significant investment by HCL in Ireland. A banking analyst said in July 2011 that BOI's IT system is "very antiquated."

=== Closing accounts associated with Palestine ===
In 2016, Bank of Ireland closed the accounts of the Irish Palestine Solidarity campaign, citing that the bank considered Palestine a high-risk country. Sinn Féin TD Mary Lou McDonald called this outrageous and an insult to the Palestinian people.

== 2008 share price collapse ==
On 5 March 2009, the shares reached €0.12 during the day, thereby reducing the value of the company by over 99% from its 2007 high. At the 2009 AGM, shareholders criticised the performance of their Auditors, PriceWaterhouseCoopers.

The Central Bank told the Oireachtas Enterprise Committee that shareholders who lost their money in the banking collapse were to blame for their fate and got what was coming to them for not keeping bank chiefs in check, but did admit that the Central Bank had failed to give sufficient warning about reckless lending to property developers.

== Arms ==
Coat of arms of Bank of Ireland
Notes Granted 30 April 1926 by Sir Nevile Rodwell Wilkinson, Ulster King of Arms. Crest On a wreath of the colours a figure of Hibernia seated vested Argent broidered Azure resting on a harp and anchor Proper. Escutcheon Azure two cornucopiae in saltire Or in chief a castle Argent. Motto Prospere Securus Other elements Mantling: Gyles doubled Argent.

== See also ==
- List of banks in the euro area
- List of banks in the Republic of Ireland

== Sources ==
- McDonald, Frank (1985). The destruction of Dublin. Gill and Macmillan. ISBN 978-0717113866.
