= Disappearance of Philip Cairns =

1986 disappearance of Irish schoolboy

Philip Cairns
- Born: Philip Cairns; 1 September 1973; Ireland
- Disappeared: 23 October 1986 (aged 13); Ballyroan, Dublin, Ireland
- Status: Missing for 40 years
- Height: 5 ft 2 in (157 cm)

On 23 October 1986, Philip Cairns, a 13‑year‑old Irish schoolboy, disappeared while walking back to school in South Dublin from his home in Ballyroan. A large‑scale investigation was carried out, but no trace of Cairns has ever been found. It remains one of the most high‑profile disappearances in recent Irish history.

Cairns' family have issued numerous appeals for information. A reconstruction took place in 2007 and was later televised on RTÉ One, while a reward of €10,000 has also been offered. The book When Heaven Waits, published in 2007, featured an interview with Cairns' mother. No suspect has been arrested in the case. The case remains open.

== Background ==
Philip Cairns was born on 1 September 1973, the eldest child of Alice (née Brennan) and Philip Sr. He has four sisters, Mary, Sandra, Helen and Suzanne, and one younger brother, Eoin. His brother has spoken of his memories of him, which include childhood games of soccer, fishing and hurling.

At the time of his disappearance, Cairns was in his first year of secondary school, having been at the school for seven weeks.

== Disappearance ==
Cairns disappeared on 23 October 1986 while returning to school in Rathfarnham. He had left Coláiste Éanna secondary school at 12:45 to go home for lunch. He departed his home at 13:30 to return to Coláiste Éanna. There have been no confirmed sightings of him since. His family believe he was abducted by someone who knew him personally.

Speculation at his school the day after his disappearance had Cairns being kidnapped by a "bad man" who had offered him sweets then lured him into a van.

Locations
1 Ballyroan Road junction of Ballyroan Crescent - last sighting of Philip Cairns possibly getting in a red Mazda or Toyota.
2 Schoolbag found in laneway between Anne Devlin Road and Anne Devlin Drive days after initial search.

== Investigation ==
Several hundred Garda Síochána officers and divers took part in a large-scale search of forests, lakes, mountains and rivers. Psychics and clairvoyants were called in to assist. Posters were distributed by milk companies. Cairns' classmates were interviewed by Gardaí at the school during their mid-term holiday break the following week.

Six days after his disappearance, two girls discovered Cairns' school bag in an alley near his house. The lane had already been searched, and the bag was not there at that time. The bag was thought to hold vital clues, but how it came to be in the lane is unknown. It is believed that it had only been in the alleyway a short time before it was found. It was examined forensically but no clues were located. Cairns' implements, including pens, pencils, copybook, maths textbook, school journal and his pencil case were inside. Some of his books were missing, including a geography book and two religion books. A forensic examination produced no clues as to his whereabouts. Gardaí sealed the bag and it is now locked in a safe.

More than 400 sightings were reported in the aftermath of his disappearance. In one, Cairns was reportedly seen in Manchester in the United Kingdom after his disappearance. Each sighting was seriously investigated, but none led to him.

== Aftermath ==
Cairns' parents appeared regularly on the news and clutched what has become a well-recognised picture of him smiling in confirmation clothes. This photo has been deemed a precursor to that of British infant Madeleine McCann, who disappeared in Portugal 21 years later. However, the family, unlike the McCanns, have been relatively private about their loss, speaking to the media only occasionally. It has been reported that this is due to several inaccurate reports of the incident of which they have disapproved. Gardaí have, however, praised the media as a proven method for encouraging people to come forward with information on the case each time an appeal is broadcast. Residents' organisation ACRA also launched an intense campaign to attempt to find Cairns.

Several theories were reported by the media, most of which were discounted by investigators. These have ranged from death by accident to Cairns being taken by extremists such as paedophiles and Satanists. One theory had a woman tell Gardaí that her partner, an alleged paedophile, had killed Cairns after abducting him. This was later declared a false allegation.

“I hoped every day for months. I left the light on in the hall downstairs and in the bed at night. I used to listen to see if he would come in the door. You would be hoping the phone would ring and that would be him."

— Alice Cairns, speaking in the book When Heaven Waits.

Detectives based at Rathfarnham Garda Station have been reinvestigating the disappearance of Cairns for several years. Several searches of land have occurred since the disappearance, often without the media being informed.

In October 2006, the Cairns family appealed for information on the 20th anniversary of the disappearance. They said they had not given up hope of finding him alive. A special Mass was held to mark the occasion. A further appeal for information was launched following the 21st anniversary of Cairns' disappearance in 2007, when it emerged that over 50 people had approached investigators individually and provided new lines of inquiry. That month saw a reconstruction of Cairns' typical school route being broadcast on RTÉ One's Crimecall television series and the Irish Crimestoppers Trust offering a €10,000 reward for information. Within one day, over 80 people had been in contact with Gardaí or Crimestoppers in what was described as a "tremendous response".

In May 2009, investigators searched a stretch of private, wooded south Dublin land near a golf club on the M50 motorway. On 6 May, the area was sealed off and vegetation cleared. Specialist equipment and finger tip examination techniques were used in an attempt to detect evidence of soil movement. A second search was carried out around 50 metres away later that month. An elderly woman from Dublin told Gardaí that Cairns was murdered and later buried at both sites. She said that a man she was in a relationship with some time before confessed to killing him. Despite the involvement of geophysicists, the searches both proved to be a failure. The man is now a pensioner who lives in Rathfarnham, and cannot be charged due to lack of evidence.

In 2020, former detective Alan Bailey stated he believes the person behind Cairns' disappearance knew the area well. He stated:

“It certainly wasn’t a random stranger or random grab off the street." “I think with the bag being dumped back in the same area it would suggest to me that whoever went back with that bag was comfortable in the area.

— Alan Bailey, speaking to the Irish Sunday Mirror

In May 2016, a woman contacted Gardaí to tell them that she suspected former disk jockey and convicted paedophile Eamonn Cooke killed Cairns. She alleged that she witnessed Cooke strike him with a blunt implement at the Radio Dublin studios in Inchicore.

Gardaí questioned Cooke and he reportedly confirmed that he knew Cairns, inter alia, but did not reveal the location of his body. He died in June 2016.

In August 2016, it was announced that DNA samples taken from Cairns' schoolbag did not match Cooke, but he had not been ruled out as a suspect. Gardaí also sought to identify two people who may have left the schoolbag in the laneway.

In October 2016, 30 years after Cairnswas last seen, a mass gathering took place at the location his bag was found.

Cairns' father died on 6 July 2014 at Tallaght Hospital. His mother died on 11 November 2025, aged 92.

In October 2026, it was reported that Gardaí were assessing new information about Cairns' disappearance. A public appeal for information was also made to mark the 40th anniversary.

== Impact ==
The disappearance of Cairns affected the entire country. The case was particularly unusual because it happened in the early afternoon and prompted parents to fear for the safety of their children, even in broad daylight.

== See also ==
- List of people who disappeared mysteriously: 1910–1990
- Disappearance of Mary Boyle – Ireland's longest missing child case
