= Killing of Toyosi Shittabey =

2010 stabbing in Dublin, Ireland

Toyosi Shitta-Bey
- Born: 15 July 1994; Nigeria
- Died: 2 April 2010 (aged 15); Tyrrelstown, Dublin
- Occupation: Student

Toyosi Shittabey (1994–2010) was a Nigerian-born 15-year-old student who was fatally stabbed in Tyrrelstown, Dublin, Ireland on 2 April 2010. Paul Barry and his brother, Michael Barry, were both accused of murder. Paul died before the trial began, and Michael was found not guilty.

== Parties involved ==
Toyosi had been living in Ireland since he was 4 years old. He was a football trainee with Insaka Ireland, a football team that trains African youth in Ireland.

== The stabbing ==
Toyosi and four of his friends were on their way back home from the National Aquatic Centre when the stabbing occurred. Counsel for the prosecution told the opening hearing that on 2 April 2010 Shittabey was with "four black males and five white females" when they crossed through a park beside the house of Paul Barry's brother, Michael Barry. One of the girls asked for the light of a cigarette from Paul and Michael. A row then allegedly ensued with name calling and "racist undertones". A fight subsequently broke out, resulting in Michael and Paul being kicked and punched and Michael believing one of the black males had taken his mobile phone. Witnesses said a baseball bat was produced during the altercation but was not used on anyone. The group fled the scene and the brothers decided to pursue the group in a car and retrieve Michael's mobile phone. They found the group at a roundabout in Tyrrelstown. Paul got out and approached a member of the group. Toyosi intervened and approached Paul, who was wielding a knife. Paul then stabbed Toyosi in the heart. Paul then went back to the car where, it was alleged, Michael Barry had remained and both men drove off.

== Trial and aftermath ==
The brothers Paul Barry and Michael Barry were charged with murder, but Paul was found dead on the morning of the beginning of the trial.

At the start of the trial, the prosecution said they were seeking a conviction of murder for Michael Barry, who they alleged rendered it possible for his brother to carry out the act of stabbing Shittabey. Michael Barry pleaded not guilty. Witnesses testified that Michael Barry had not carried out the act of killing Toyosi, but that he had driven his brother to the place where the stabbing occurred. The judge directed the jury to pronounce a verdict of not guilty, and Michael Barry was acquitted in December 2012.
