= Scissor Sisters (convicted killers) =

Two Irish killers (2005)

Linda and Charlotte Mulhall
- Born: • Linda: 1975 (age 50–51) • Charlotte: 1984 (age 41–42); Cork, Ireland
- Status: • Charlotte: Incarcerated at Limerick Prison • Linda: Released
- Convictions: Murder (Charlotte); Manslaughter (Linda)
- Penalty: • Life imprisonment (Charlotte) • 15 years' imprisonment (Linda)

Details
- Victims: 1
- Weapons: Stanley knife, hammer
- Date apprehended: October 2006

Location of the murder site in Dublin

Linda and Charlotte Mulhall (also called the "Scissor Sisters" by the media) are sisters from Dublin, Ireland, who murdered and dismembered their mother's boyfriend, Farah Swaleh Noor, in March 2005. Noor was killed with a Stanley knife wielded by Charlotte and struck with a hammer by Linda following a confrontation with the sisters and their mother, Kathleen Mulhall. His head and penis were sliced off and the rest of his corpse dismembered and dumped in the Royal Canal in Dublin where a piece of leg, still wearing a sock, was spotted floating near Croke Park 10 days later.

The subsequent manhunt and the trial in October 2006 attracted intense media attention as the details of the crime slowly emerged. The sisters and their mother were arrested but released until Linda confessed to involvement in the crime. Kathleen Mulhall left the country to live in England. When Charlotte and Linda were charged with murder in December 2005, their father, John Mulhall, hanged himself in Phoenix Park.

Because of the method used in Noor's killing, the Mulhalls were dubbed the "Scissor Sisters" by the media. Justice Paul Carney, presiding over the trial, said during sentencing that it was "the most grotesque killing that has occurred in my professional lifetime". Charlotte Mulhall was given a mandatory life sentence and Linda Mulhall was given a 15-year sentence for manslaughter, with both being sent to Mountjoy Women's Prison in Dublin.

Noor's head and penis were never recovered, although Linda later admitted they had put the head in rubbish bins around Phoenix Park. It was also thought that they carried the head by bus to Tallaght and buried it in a field, with Linda returning later to dig it up, carry it to another field using her son's schoolbag, smash it further with a hammer and bury it again. Linda attracted further media attention when she slit her wrists and was sectioned. Charlotte also attracted media attention when a photograph of her holding a knife to a male prisoner's throat was published; that action resulted in an increased security presence in all Irish prisons and Charlotte was moved from Mountjoy to Limerick Prison. Kathleen Mulhall voluntarily returned to Ireland in February 2008 and faced several charges. She pleaded guilty to helping clean up the crime scene to conceal evidence and was sentenced to five years in prison in May 2009.

The case resulted in several books being written and has been examined in at least one television series. It was said by the Irish Independent's legal affairs correspondent, Dearbhail McDonald, to have "fuelled fears of ritual killings in Ireland".

== Mulhall family background ==
The Mulhalls were from Kilclare Gardens, a working class area in Tallaght, south Dublin. Their parents, John and Kathleen Mulhall, raised a family of three boys and three girls. Kathleen was born Kathleen Ward and was from the Travelling community. John Mulhall allegedly abused Kathleen. Their marriage broke down and Kathleen entered into a relationship with Farah Swaleh Noor in 2002. Noor also allegedly abused Kathleen Mulhall.

=== Linda Mulhall ===
Linda Mulhall was 30 years old at the time of the killing. She was unemployed, had left school early and had four children. The relationship with the father of her children broke up and she got into another relationship with an individual called Wayne Kinsella who subsequently abused them, in one case beating the children with an electrical flex. The abuse was later investigated, and the children were taken into care by the social services, while Wayne Kinsella served a seven-year prison sentence for his cruelty to the children. Linda Mulhall, meanwhile, had a history of alcohol abuse and suffered from an addiction to heroin. She had one previous conviction in 1993 for larceny.

=== Charlotte Mulhall ===
Charlotte Mulhall was 21 years old when the killing took place. Like her sister, she had a history of drug and alcohol abuse. She had a number of minor previous convictions for criminal damage and public order offences and was charged with criminal damage and sentenced under the Probation Act in October 2005. She was also involved in prostitution.

During their trial, the Irish Police service gardaí described the girls' upbringing as "troubled and tough".

== Farah Swaleh Noor ==
Farah Swaleh Noor
- Born: 1965; Mombasa, Kenya
- Died: 20 March 2005 (aged 40); Summerhill, Dublin, Ireland
- Body discovered: Royal Canal, Dublin
- Occupation: unemployed

Farah Swaleh Noor was 40 years old at the time of his death. He arrived in Ireland in December 1996, claiming to be a Somali called "Sheilila Salim" whose family had been killed in Mogadishu during the Somali Civil War. Subsequent investigations revealed that he was in fact a Kenyan and that his family was still alive. The Department of Justice, Equality and Law Reform ordered that he be deported but he appealed and was granted Irish citizenship in March 1999 because he had become the father of an Irish-born child. He had four previous convictions for offences including intoxication, threatening and abusive behaviour and assault. In 1997, he raped a mentally disabled 16-year-old Chinese girl. She later gave birth to a son. Two other women had children by him and both claimed at the Mulhalls’ trial of having been raped by him. Noor had faced eight charges of disorder and assault, one involving a sexual assault in which a knife was found at the scene by gardaí. He was convicted on three occasions but never served time in jail. Gardaí described him as being particularly violent towards women.

== Events surrounding the killing ==
The killing took place at a flat Kathleen Mulhall was renting in a house on Richmond Cottages, Summerhill, on 20 March 2005. This was on the public holiday of Saint Patrick's weekend.

=== Build-up to the killing ===
On the day of the killing, Linda, Charlotte, their mother and Farah Swaleh Noor had been drinking heavily in Dublin city centre. They returned to Kathleen Mulhall's flat where the women took ecstasy. Kathleen Mulhall crushed a tablet into the victim's drink so they were "all on the same buzz”.

=== Death of Noor ===
Linda and Noor were sitting on a two-seater couch with Charlotte sitting on the arm, when Noor started touching Linda in a sexual way. He spoke into her ear, put his arms around her waist and refused to let her go. Kathleen then started screaming at him and an argument took place where Kathleen Mulhall was alleged to have instructed them to "just kill him for me". Charlotte picked up a Stanley knife and struck Noor across the throat, inflicting a wound that sent him to the ground. Linda then picked up a hammer and hit him on the head a number of times. Their mother looked on but did not participate. Noor was stabbed more than 20 times.

=== Dismemberment and disposal of the corpse ===
Linda and Charlotte then dragged Noor's corpse into the bathroom where they began to dismember the remains. Noor's head, limbs and penis were severed using a kitchen knife and hammer. They put towels over his legs to stem the flow of blood. The dismemberment took a number of hours and the body parts were placed in black plastic bags and a sports bag before being disposed of in the Royal Canal. This took the three women several trips. They decided not to throw the head in to prevent identification. The head was brought by bus to Tallaght where they walked through The Square Shopping Centre to Sean Walsh Memorial Park. They walked to where Charlotte dug a hole with a knife to bury the head. Kathleen Mulhall threw the knives and the hammer into a nearby pond. A number of days later, Linda Mulhall allegedly returned to the park and dug up the head. Using her son's schoolbag, she transferred it to a field in the Killinarden Estate, Tallaght, where she broke it up with a hammer before burying it again.

== Garda Síochána investigation ==
The killing only came to light ten days later when Noor's leg, with a sock on the end, was seen floating in the canal, a few hundred yards from Croke Park. Garda sub-aqua divers retrieved most of the rest of his body in seven parts. Gardaí traced his identity through media appeals. Noor was only identified when someone recognised a T-shirt on the recovered torso. That key witness, a Somali man who was the first to connect the missing Noor with the three Mulhall women, was paid a "substantial" reward by Crimestoppers. Noor's head and penis were never found.

The sisters and their parents were arrested in August but denied any knowledge of the killing. A number of weeks later Linda contacted investigating officers admitting her involvement. Gardaí took a voluntary statement from her at her home in Tallaght in August 2005. Until this, Gardaí had been making limited progress in the case. When Gardaí searched the Mulhall flat in Summerhill, they found bloodstains that were later confirmed to match Noor's DNA. After Linda's confession, Kathleen Mulhall fled the country in September 2005 and gardaí were unable to locate her again until January 2008. She was living in England.

== Court cases ==
=== Murder trial of Linda and Charlotte Mulhall ===
Linda and Charlotte were both charged with murder and pleaded not guilty in the Central Criminal Court. Their trial took place in October 2006 with Linda Mulhall being found guilty of manslaughter while her sister Charlotte was found guilty of the murder of Noor. Linda's jury accepted her defence of provocation.

Charlotte Mulhall was given the mandatory life sentence and Linda Mulhall was given a 15-year sentence for manslaughter. The judge argued that Linda, a heroin addict, had initially tried to halt the trial by refusing to take methadone. Leave to appeal was refused for both sentences.

Linda Mulhall appealed the severity of her sentence on the grounds that it was passed without psychiatric and probation reports. This appeal failed, with the Court of Criminal Appeal finding the sentence to be appropriate.

Charlotte Mulhall requested leave to appeal her conviction on the grounds that Justice Carney had put pressure on the jury to reach a verdict even though the foreman had indicated they were deadlocked. This failed on the grounds that the defence did not raise objections to the comments during the trial and the fact that the jury was not affected by any alleged undue pressure to reach a verdict.

=== Court case against Kathleen Mulhall ===
Kathleen Mulhall voluntarily returned to Ireland in February 2008 and, among other offences, was charged with two counts of giving false information to gardaí about Noor's whereabouts, and withholding information which she "knew or believed" would be of assistance in prosecuting her daughters for Noor's murder. She was also charged with impeding an arrest in the murder investigation. She pleaded guilty to helping to clean up the crime scene to conceal evidence. Kathleen Mulhall was sentenced to five years in prison in May 2009.

== Fallout and aftermath ==
=== Mulhall family ===
The girls' father, John Mulhall, died by suicide in December 2005. He was not believed to have been involved in the killing.

Linda Mulhall turned to alcohol and slashed her arms, causing her to spend over a week in a psychiatric hospital. In April 2009, she claimed to fellow inmates that she had, in fact, smashed Noor's head and distributed the fragments in rubbish bins in the Phoenix Park. This first disclosure of where Noor's head had ended up was referred to as "the final secret of the Scissor Sisters" by Cormac Looney in the Evening Herald.

Charlotte caused a further national controversy in 2008 when photographs of her holding a knife to the throat of a male prisoner in Mountjoy Prison were leaked to the press. As a result, security in Irish prisons was increased. and Charlotte was moved to Limerick Prison, the only other Irish prison to contain a women's unit.

The girls' brother, James Mulhall, pleaded guilty to the robbery of two prostitutes, claiming he robbed the women to support his own six children and his sister Linda's four children whom he took on after she was jailed.

=== Books ===
The case received a high amount of attention due to the grotesque and macabre nature of the crime. This led to the sisters being dubbed "The Scissor Sisters" by the media after the pop group from New York, USA.

Several books were written on the circumstances surrounding the death of Farah Swaleh Noor:

- The Torso in the Canal — John Mooney (Maverick House, ISBN 978-1-905379-38-5)
- The Irish Scissor Sisters — Mick McCaffrey (Merlin Publishing, ISBN 1-903582-72-5) McCaffrey covered the case for the Sunday Tribune.

=== Television series ===
The 2009 RTÉ television series Killers featured the Mulhall sisters.

=== Release ===
Linda Mulhall was released in 2018, having served over 12 years of a 15-year sentence. Linda was tracked down in July 2018 by a reporter, and requested privacy.

It has been reported that Charlotte will be released in 2026, twenty years after the killing.
