= Kidnapping of Don Tidey =

1983 kidnapping-for-ransom by the Provisional Irish Republican Army

- Part of The Troubles
Date	24 November 1983 – 16 December 1983
Location	Derrada Wood,Ballinamore, County Leitrim 54.098695°N 7.792336°W
Result	Don Tidey released after 23 days of captivity

Belligerents
Garda Síochána; Irish Army; Army Ranger Wing	Provisional Irish Republican Army (PIRA)

Strength
large numbers of Garda officers & Irish Defense Forces soldiers; section of Army Ranger Wing commandos	one Active service unit (~4 PIRA volunteers)

Casualties and losses
one Garda killed; one soldier killed	All escaped capture
- Location within Ireland

In November 1983, Irish supermarket executive Don Tidey was abducted by members of the Provisional Irish Republican Army (PIRA) and held hostage for 22 days in a wood in County Leitrim with demands for a IR£5 million ransom. Tidy was freed on 16 December 1983, in a joint Garda Síochána and Irish Defense Forces rescue. Trainee Garda Gary Sheehan and Irish Army soldier Patrick Kelly were killed in the shootout, while all of Tidey's kidnappers escaped. Irish Republican activist Brendan McFarlane was charged in 1998 with Tidey's kidnapping, but the case collapsed due to evidence being ruled as inadmissible. The dramatic circumstances of Tidey's rescue, such as the violation of internal PIRA rules excluding military action in the Irish Republic, generated widespread concern within both the Irish Government and the Irish general public.

== Background ==
From the late 1960's, the Provisional IRA had waged a guerrilla warfare campaign against the British Army with the intention of expelling it from Northern Ireland via force of arms and thereafter uniting Ireland into a 32 county socialist republic. The IRA sourced military materiel from a wide variety of sources, however their primary source of modern small arms in the 1970's was from American arms shipments. After coming under pressure from both the Irish and British governments, in 1980 the Federal Bureau of Investigation set up a specialized unit to target IRA sympathisers purchasing arms in the United States of America. A number of Irish Republican weapons traffickers, such as George Harrison, were later arrested after being caught in sting operations attempting to source arms for the IRA. Around the same time, funds from NORAID were disrupted after its founder Michael Flannery was arrested for conspiracy to illegally obtain weapons, after an associate handed US$16,800 to an undercover FBI agent in return for dozens of automatic rifles, submachine guns and handguns.

Although the IRA had previously launched armed robberies on banks and post offices as a form of "revolutionary tax", increased security at financial institutions along with armed escorts for transfers of cash made such operations unviable, as well as increasing the risk of confrontations with Irish security forces which IRA standing orders forbade. The result of these restrictions meant that in the early 1980s the IRA was on was on the brink of bankruptcy, as it needed an estimated IRL£2.5 million per year to operate. In order to raise funds to purchase weapons from mainland Europe and cover operating costs, the IRA Army Council directed that a number of kidnappings take place in the Republic of Ireland. As they had access to large amounts of on premises cash, supermarket executives were a favoured target. In October 1981, Ben Dunne was kidnapped by the IRA and later released after a IRL£1 million cash ransom was paid. In August 1983, a failed kidnap attempt on Wicklow based retail tycoon Galen Weston resulted in multiple IRA members being shot by armed Garda Síochána officers.

== Kidnap of Tidey ==
Don Tidey, originally from the London district of Hackney, served in the Combined Cadet Force in the early 1950s before joining the Territorial Army and eventually rising to the rank of Captain. He later moved to Ireland to work as an executive of Associated British Foods, and was eventually promoted to chairman of Quinnsworth supermarkets. In late November 1983, the then 48-year-old Tidey was driving his teenaged daughter to school on the southern outskirts of Dublin when he was stopped at what appeared to be a police checkpoint in Rathfarnham. A gun was put to his head and he was bundled into a waiting car which drove off. A few days later, a photograph of Tidey holding a recent copy of the Evening Herald newspaper was sent to Associated British Foods and a phone call demanding an IR£5 million ransom was made. In response, the Irish Minister for Justice Michael Noonan reiterated the government's longstanding position that no ransom should be paid to terrorists.

== Search for Tidey ==
After being taken to a temporary shelter in an evergreen forest, Tidey was kept confined to a sleeping bag, where he was bound with handcuffs and had a hood placed over his head. Tidey had his business suit removed and was dressed in combat-style clothing, while his shoes were replaced with wellington boots filled with straw. His captors wore khaki fatigues and were masked with balaclavas, and made no attempt to engage in small talk with their hostage. Tidey is fed mostly bread and tea, and was only allowed out of the shelter twice a day to relieve himself.

Garda Síochána armed detectives and Irish Army soldiers search woodland for PIRA kidnap victim Don Tidey in 1983

The search for Tidey focused on remote parts of the border region with Northern Ireland, where PIRA training camps had previously been discovered in wooded areas. The search area was eventually narrowed down to the Ballinamore area in County Leitrim after Garda intelligence noticed a suspicious increase of activity in what was a sparsely populated area, which also happened to be the hometown of hardline Irish republican activist John Joe McGirl. Gardaí decided to search the entire area within a ten-mile radius of Ballinamore, which amounted to approximately 300 square miles, and after securing an outer cordon flooded the area with security force members. The vast size of the search area necessitated trainee Garda recruits from Templemore barracks being drafted into search parties.

Due to the risk of an armed confrontation with the kidnappers, Garda detectives armed with Uzi's were augmented with soldiers carrying a mixture of FN FAL rifles and Gustaf 9mm sub machine guns. Along with a large contingent of police and soldiers, the elite Irish Army Ranger Wing had been deployed to assist the search, and were reported to have covertly swept areas of interest using night-vision goggles while armed with HK MP5 sub machine guns.

== Rescue in Leitrim ==
On 16 December 1983, Tidey and his kidnappers were tracked down to an area of commercial forestry in Derrada Wood, which was approximately 8 kilometers north of Ballinamore. Tidey would later remark his captors became agitated after hearing voices and dogs barking nearby, after which they released him from handcuffs and replaced his hood with a balaclava similar to theirs. A search party encountered two armed men in military-style clothing amongst some pine trees and challenged them to identify themselves. An exchange of automatic gunfire suddenly erupted which allowed Tidey to escape in the confusion, however a trainee Garda (Gary Sheehan) and an Irish Army soldier (Patrick Kelly) were killed. The kidnappers also threw RGD-5 hand grenades to cover their escape, and promptly disarmed a number of security force members before using them as human shields while advancing across open fields towards the nearest road. From monitoring Garda frequencies on a radio scanner the IRA men knew they were surrounded, and eventually hijacked an Opel Kadett car to aid their escape. Tidey's kidnappers then managed to shoot their way out of the Garda cordon, wounding another Garda officer in the process, and thus escaped capture.

== Aftermath ==
The deaths of two Irish security force members during the searches for Tidey caused widespread outrage in the Republic of Ireland, where Taoiseach Garret FitzGerald considered banning Sinn Féin in retaliation, as it was the alleged political wing of the Provisional Irish Republican Army at that time. The day after Tidey's rescue, three police officers and three civilians were killed after the IRA bombed Harrods department store in central London, with dozens of other civilians also being seriously injured. FitzGerald sent a message of sympathy to his British counterpart Margaret Thatcher after the bombing, which emphasised how both governments were fighting a common enemy in PIRA. FitzGerald also had an opinion piece published in The Times highlighting the "shared grief and shared outrage" between both countries as a result of political terrorism. Both incidents had long-term political implications regarding Ireland–United Kingdom relations, persuading a previously sceptical Thatcher into promoting greater co-operation with the Irish government, which eventually resulted in the 1985 Anglo-Irish Agreement.

Although none of Tidey's captors were ever convicted, several co-conspirators were successfully prosecuted in relation to his kidnapping:

- Michael Burke, who was later identified as the "Garda officer" at the fake checkpoint outside Tidey's house, was sentenced to 12 years in prison for his role in the kidnapping
- John Curnan, who owned the forestry where Tidey was held captive, was convicted of false imprisonment and sentenced to 7 years incarceration
- William Kelly, who hired a car used by the kidnappers, was sentenced to 3 years in prison

== McFarlane prosecution ==
Brendan McFarlane (1951 – 21 February 2025) was a Belfast born Irish republican who in 1976 was sentenced to life in prison for his involvement in the Bayardo Bar attack. While incarcerated in the maximum security Maze Prison, McFarlane was Officer Commanding for PIRA inmates during the 1981 Irish hunger strike in which 10 republican prisoners died. In September 1983, McFarlane lead the Maze Prison escape and went on the run in the Republic of Ireland. In January 1986, McFarlane was recaptured in the Netherlands along with fellow escapee Gerry Kelly after a raid on their safe house by Dutch SWAT Team members and was eventually returned to the Maze Prison to complete his sentence, before being released on parole in 1997. Authorities in the Republic of Ireland had suspected McFarlane of taking part in the kidnap of Tidey and being involved in the deaths of Garda Gary Sheehan and Army Private Patrick Kelly in 1983, and the Garda Crime and Security Branch had discreetly asked senior officers to keep track of McFarlane's movements after his release from prison in Northern Ireland.

=== Arrest and charge ===
On 5 January 1998, electronic surveillance alerted Gardaí intelligence that McFarlane was on a bus travelling from Dublin Airport to Belfast, and after the bus was stopped outside Dundalk by Gardaa Special Branch officers McFarlane was arrested under the Offences Against the State Act then taken into custody for interrogation. McFarlane was thereafter charged with false imprisonment, possession of a firearm with intent to endanger life and possession of a firearm for an unlawful purpose in relation to Tidey's kidnapping.

=== Pre-trial legal proceedings ===
McFarlane sought judicial review regarding his prosecution, and challenged alleged fingerprint evidence on the basis that Gardaí had lost a number of exhibits containing the actual fingerprints. The Gardaí had charged McFarlane on the basis of items that were recovered from the rescue site in 1983, such as a milk carton and a plastic container, on which McFarlane's fingerprints were allegedly discovered. Although the physical items had since went missing from Garda headquarters, the actual fingerprints themselves had been photographed and a forensic analysis completed. In March 2006, the Irish Supreme Court ruled McFarlane's trial could proceed. McFarlane was due to stand trial in October 2006, but his legal team launched a judicial review in May 2006 on the grounds that McFarlane could not get a fair trial due to "systematic delays in bringing the prosecution". McFarlane's appeal was dismissed in March 2008 after a landmark Supreme Court rulling, and the trial opened in the Special Criminal Court on 11 June 2008.

=== Trial ===
Prosecuting counsel Edward Comyn SC outlined to the court the circumstances of Tidey's kidnapping and subsequent rescue in December 1983, and described how fingerprints recovered from the scene along with admissions made during interrogation by Gardaí comprised the incriminating evidence against McFarlane.

==== Prosecution evidence ====
Don Tidey testified that after being forced into the back of a car on the morning of his abduction in 1983, he was struck on the head with the butt of a handgun and eventually brought to farmland where he was interrogated about phone numbers in his pocket diary. His captors informed him he was being held for ransom, and they needed to contact someone who would be in a position to pay it. Tidey also described to the court his conditions in captivity and the chaotic circumstances of his rescue, where after a gun battle erupted he rolled down a hill and was then taken into custody by Irish security force members.

Retired Sergeant Tom Barrett testified how when searching Derrada Wood he suddenly discovered a black polythene makeshift tent with two men holding assault rifles outside it, and after a challenge was issued a burst of heavy gunfire was fired in his direction. Retired Army corporal William O’Brien described to the court how a fellow Defence Forces member emerged from the woods with his hands on his head, followed by two men armed with an M16 rifle and a submachine gun, who thereafter disarmed the rest of his patrol. Detective Garda Francis Moran told the court how in 1983 he was a trainee Garda brought into help with the search for Tidey at Derrada Wood, and on the day of his rescue he heard volleys of automatic gunfire and several hand grenade detonations from a clump of pine trees. A group of bearded men in combat uniforms suddenly emerged and took Moran and his colleagues hostage, forcing them to run in front of them with their hands in the air as human shields while they continued to shoot at other Irish security force members in the distance.

Retired Detective Sergeant Patrick Ennis described to the Special Criminal Court how an examination of the forestry Tidey was rescued from revealed a 15 feet long by 6 feet wide improvised tunnel made from heavy duty polythene plastic sheeting and underlaid with straw, which had been camouflaged on the outside with tree branches and other undergrowth. Inside the makeshift tent, investigating officers found items such as a Warsaw Pact origin hand grenade, a Steyr MPi 69 sub machine gun, three rifles (an M1 Garand and two bolt action hunting rifles), ammunition, and handcuffs, along with various cooking utensils and five sleeping bags. Det Sgt Ennis told the court how none of the weapons found at the scene matched the ballistic evidence recovered from the bodies of Garda Gary Sheehan or Private Patrick Kelly. Spent shell casings recovered from the front of the polythene tent were determined to have been fired from a Heckler & Koch G3 rifle and an AK 47 type rifle, and as neither of these weapons were in Garda or Irish Army inventories it was assumed these were the rifles used in the fatal shootings, Det Sgt Ennis added.

Superintendent James Sheridan testified to the court how at 11am on 5 January 1998 he received a phone call from a senior Garda officer saying that a man fitting McFarlane's description was on a bus to Belfast. Sheridan went onto describe how the bus was stopped on the M1 motorway at 11:45am just south of the border with Northern Ireland, and when McFarlane was informed he was being arrested for possession of firearms at Derrada Wood in December 1983 he made no comment. Detective Garda Enda Rice told the court that he put specific allegations to McFarlane, such as him being dressed in a Garda uniform at the fake checkpoint in Rathfarnham and that he had direct involvement in the fatal shooting of Garda Sheehan and Private Kelly, however McFarlane remained silent and stared at the wall of the interview room. Giving evidence for the prosecution, retired Detective Garda James Hanley claimed McFarlane had admitted during interrogation that he was present at the makeshift camp in Derrada Wood where Tidley was held, and agreed that Garda fingerprint evidence proved it. Hanley further claimed McFarlane made no reply when asked if he was present when Garda Sheehan and Private Kelly were shot dead on the day in question.

==== Challenge to "admissions" ====
McFarlane's barrister Hugh Hartnett SC denied his client made any such admissions but instead exercised his right to silence by refusing to answer any questions at all, and asserted that Gardaí had altered their interview notes in order to incriminate him. Hartnett SC highlighted how at a bail application hearing in January 1998, Superintendent John McElligot informed the judge that the main evidence against McFarlane was fingerprints found on items at the rescue site, with no mention at all of any verbal admissions. Hartnett SC asserted this was because the fabricated "admission" had not been inserted into the interview notes yet, and in light of this alleged falsification he was making an application to the court to have all Garda interview records ruled as inadmissible in evidence. Taking the stand to give evidence in his own defence, McFarlane denied making any admissions during Garda interviews, and confirmed that although the notes of each interview were read back to him the alleged confessions were not, which implied they were added in at a later stage. McFarlane also denied confessing his involvement in Tidey's kidnap only after suddenly being confronted with fingerprint evidence in January 1998, claiming he had read in a newspaper years before that Gardaí had purportedly recovered his fingerprints on items found in Derrada Woods and this fact was no surprise to him.

==== McFarlane acquitted ====
On 26 June 2008, McFarlane's trial collapsed after incriminating statements McFarlane allegedly made following his arrest were ruled inadmissible, and McFarlane walked free from the court. Presiding Judges Mr Justice Paul Butler, Judge Alison Lindsay and Judge Cormac Dunne, ruled that the eight interviews with Gardaí were not conducted in accordance with relevant statutory regulations, declaring that discrepancies in recording McFarlane's alleged admissions and the date & time records of interview notes compelled the court to exclude them from evidence. In light of this, Prosecuting counsel Fergal Foley declared that the State was "offering no further evidence" and an application to acquit was tendered by McFarlane's defence lawyers, which the court granted.

In September 2010, McFarlane was awarded compensation following a European Court of Human Rights ruling that the legal proceedings relating to the kidnapping of supermarket executive Don Tidey had been "unreasonably long", and the Irish government was ordered to pay €5,400 in damages within three months and a further €10,000 in legal costs.

== See also ==
- McFarlane v Director of Public Prosecutions
