= Paul Marlowe (Irish republican) =

Irish republican (c.1945–1976)

- Born: c. 1945; Ardoyne, Belfast, Northern Ireland
- Died: 16 October 1976 (aged 30–31); Gasworks, Ormeau Road, Belfast, Northern Ireland
- Cause of death: Killed in premature bomb explosion
- Burial place: Milltown Cemetery
- Military career
- Allegiance: Irish Republic (1969–1976); United Kingdom (1960s–1969)
- Branch: Provisional IRA (1969–1976) Irish Republican Army (1969) British Army (1960s–1969)
- Rank: Training Officer (T/O) (Provisional IRA)
- Units: A Company, 2nd Battalion, Belfast Brigade (Provisional IRA); Special Air Service (British Army)
- Conflicts: Malayan Emergency; Aden crisis; The Troubles

Paul Marlowe (c. 1945 – 16 October 1976) was a Volunteer in the Provisional IRA's Belfast Brigade. He held the rank of Training Officer when he and two other volunteers, Frank Fitzsimons and Joey Surgenor, were killed when a bomb they were planting exploded prematurely at Belfast gasworks in October 1976. Marlowe was 31 and had a wife and three children when he died.

== Early life ==
Paul Marlowe was born in Ardoyne, in north Belfast, an Irish nationalist enclave, surrounded by Loyalist areas in 1945. His father drove lorries on the Shore Road. Marlowe grew up in Duneden Park, and was the youngest of three children. He had an elder brother, Con, and a sister, Margaret. Marlowe was educated at Holy Cross Boys' School and subsequently St Gabriel's school. Around the age of 13, he joined the Air Training Corps and drilled with the B-Specials on the Divis, and learnt gliding. Once a month they were flown to Sydenham for orienteering and manoeuvres, occasionally being dropped from a Shackleton bomber. He moved to England in the early 1960s. To escape unemployment, Marlowe joined the British Army at the age of 16, first in the Irish Guards and then as a paratrooper serving with the Parachute Regiment and SAS in both Malaysia during the Malayan Emergency and in Aden during the Aden crisis as well as Borneo. A fellow volunteer, John O'Carroll, has described the circumstances of Marlowe's leaving the SAS:

He came out of the jungle mucked to the eyeballs and tried to get into the officers’ mess. They wouldn't let him in, so he threw smoke grenades and then fired shots at them as they scrambled out.

While in England, Marlowe married one Annette; they had three children. He appears to have bought a discharge from the army around 1970.

== Irish Republican Army ==
Marlowe returned to Belfast, moving first to the Finaghy Road, and subsequently to the Lower Falls. England and joined the Irish Republican Army in 1969 sometime after the 1969 Northern Ireland riots in which Ardoyne was heavily attacked and two Catholic civilians (Samuel McLarnon, 27, and Michael Lynch, 28) were killed by machine-gun fire. Marlowe decided to side with the Provisional IRA when they split with the Official IRA in December 1969. He has been described as "very politically aware but he had no time for politicians. His idea was to get the war finished first and keep as many volunteers alive as possible. There would be time for politics after that." In 1970 he was offered the opportunity to become a mercenary in Angola on a salary of £400 (equivalent to £5,486 in 2025); he turned the offer down.

Marlowe was a part of the Belfast Brigade's Third battalion which located around Ardoyne, the New Lodge and Ligoniel's area in north Belfast. Becoming a "key member", he moved up the Brigade level fast because of his experience in the British Army. He was involved in training new recruits, having been instrumental in restructuring the Brigade's training process. He instructed colleagues on basic rural fieldcraft: tactics, ambushes, sniping and counterintelligence, as well as map reading, compass navigation and abseiling. Marlowe was credited introducing the IRA to the Claymore mine—the first time they were used outside of the Vietnam War—and developing their own version.

Marlowe was Interned in 1971 for a short period, during which time he met Gerry Adams, who had the bunk next to Marlowe. Marlowe helped organised Adams' proposed escape attempt. Adams decided to smuggle himself out under a food lorry, concealed in the chassis; Marlowe constructed a harness to carry him, hooked beneath the lorry, which was also experimented on by Brendan Hughes in the latter's bunkbed. On his release Marlowe became a member of the Belfast Brigade's 1st Battalion staff as a training officer. Fellow volunteer Kieran Conway has described Marlowe as "tall, lean [and] super-fit".

== Death ==
Memorial to Marlowe in Stanfield Place, Belfast

Marlowe was killed on 16 October 1976 leading a unit comprising himself, Frank Fitzsimons (28) and Joey Surgenor (23). The operation involved planting a bomb, made of sodium chlorate and nitrobenzene, at a British Army post next to the Belfast gasworks on the Ormeau Road. Although there are contradictory accounts of their deaths, it is likely that the bomb exploded prematurely, ignited the gasometer—and setting off four other explosions as a result—creating a huge fireball which engulfed and killed the men instantly. The fire was visible 10 miles (16 km) away. It has also been claimed that the three men were ambushed by soldiers who set off the bomb after they had been killed. All three men were very experienced Volunteers and had over 15 years of experience between the three of them. Surgenor was one of the Volunteers who helped Billy McKee defend the Short Strand in June 1970. The three men's funerals took place on 20 October 1976 and they were buried in the Republican plot at Milltown Cemetery.

At his inquest, held in November 1977, it was reported that the blasts had occurred 25 feet (7.6 m) from the gasometer and 75 yards (69 m) from the army post. Parts of one body were found 150 yards (140 m) away, and at first police investigators were uncertain as to the number of victims. Timers, detonators, and a rucksack were also found.

== See also ==
- Roy Walsh (Irish republican)
- Gerry Kelly
- Patricia Black
