= Provisional IRA in the Republic of Ireland =

The Provisional IRA in the Republic of Ireland was very active in the country during the Troubles (1969–1998). The country was seen as a safe haven for IRA members who used it to flee from British security forces, organise training and homemade weapons, and conduct attacks on British or Loyalist targets in nearby Northern Ireland, England, and even continental Europe. Irish authorities viewed armed activity by Irish republican militants in their country as a major security risk and took steps to mitigate it. They censored representatives of such militants from appearing on television or radio by Section 31 of the Broadcasting Act, introduced the non-jury Special Criminal Court to easily prosecute the militants, and made it illegal to be members of certain Republican militant organisations.

Despite this, sympathetic Irish citizens and their territory itself provided the most external support to the IRA more than any nation, group or organisation. Nearly all of the PIRA finances that were used in its armed campaign came from criminal or legitimate activities in the Republic and Northern Ireland. Hundreds of training camps, safe houses, supply routes, and bomb factories were established in the Republic. Many of the PIRA founders were from the Republic, and thousands of Republic residents joined the IRA as volunteers during the 1969-98 period. In spite of the harsh measures taken by the Irish government, there is little to no evidence these had any detrimental effect on IRA activities in the Republic. (Note: "The sheer level of sympathy and support that existed for militant republicanism [in the Republic of Ireland] demonstrates that the longevity of the ‘Troubles’ was due in large part to this widespread tolerance and aid. Former IRA volunteers attest to in interviews and previously unpublished accounts of training camps in the Republic. Juried courts for IRA suspects were phased out as both juries and judges were regularly acquitting republicans in cases of blatant IRA activity.")

The Republic also had to deal with mostly small but hundreds of attacks by loyalist and republican paramilitaries in its territory, including bombings, prison escapes, kidnappings, and gun battles. The largest loss of life both in its territory and the entire conflict came on 17 May 1974, when the Glenanne gang–an informal alliance of loyalist militants and British security forces–exploded no warning bombs in the cities of Dublin and Monaghan; 33 civilians were killed and 300 others injured.

== Activity in the Republic of Ireland ==
=== Training camps ===
Since the beginning of the war in 1969, a number of training camps in the Republic of Ireland were established by the Provisional Irish Republican Army (IRA). The IRA Southern Command, headquartered in Dublin, was responsible for maintaining these camps in the Republic and recruiting volunteers to be trained on weapons procured either within the country or overseas.

=== Finances ===
To finance their armed campaigns during the Troubles (1969–1998), the IRA engaged in numerous illegal and semi-legitimate funding activities within the Republic of Ireland, such as fundraising, bank robbery, extortion, drug trafficking, bootleg recording, racketeering and legitimate businesses such as social clubs, taxi companies, and retail shops. Most or nearly all of the revenue for the IRA came from legitimate and criminal activities within Ireland, all which contributed to the longevity of the conflict as it enabled the group to buy enough guns and explosives. Overseas donations, including $12 million in cash from Libyan leader Muammar Gaddafi and $3.6 million raised by NORAID in America for the Republican cause (but not necessarily directly to the IRA coffers), were often exaggerated.

The Northern Ireland Affairs Select Committee in its 26 June 2002 report stated that "the importance of overseas donations has been exaggerated and donations from the USA have formed only a small portion of IRA income." It identified extortion, fuel laundering, rum-running, tobacco smuggling, armed robbery, and counterfeiting in Ireland and Britain as the primary sources of funding for both Republican and Loyalist militants throughout and after the Troubles, while "the sums involved [from overseas] [were and] are comparatively small". The committee estimated that the Provisional IRA made £5-8 million a year against annual spending of £1.5m to carry out its campaign.

=== Attacks within ===
To avoid alienating support within the Republic of Ireland, the IRA Southern Command issued General Order No.8, in which its first provision stated:

Volunteers are strictly forbidden to take any military action against 26 County forces under any circumstances whatsoever. The importance of this order in present circumstances especially in the border areas cannot be over-emphasised.

In spite of this order, IRA volunteers and members of the Irish security forces (namely the Irish Army and the Republic of Ireland's police force, Garda Síochána) often clashed in the country which led to deaths and injuries. For example, a trainee Garda and an Irish Army soldier were killed in a shootout during the rescue of Don Tidey in 1983, while Detective Garda Jerry McCabe was killed by machine-gun fire as he sat in his patrol car in Adare County Limerick during the escort of a post office delivery in 1996. In total, the Provisional IRA killed six Gardaí and one Irish Army]soldier, mostly during robberies.

== Arms importation into Northern Ireland and England ==
=== 1969–1979 ===
After 1969, and the split with the Official IRA, the Provisional IRA gained control of a majority of the stockpiled weaponry still held from previous IRA campaigns. It found that the stockpiles consisted mostly of pre-World War II small firearms from British and Irish armouries ranging from Lee–Enfield, plus Bren light machine guns (LMG), a Thompson submachine gun (SMG), and Webley revolvers from British and Irish armouries. In February 1970, the IRA raided a Fórsa Cosanta Áitiúil (FCA) barracks in Midleton, County Cork, acquiring a Vickers machine gun, two Bren guns, and six converted .303 rifles. Small arms were also reported missing from Irish Defence Forces barracks, with one man receiving a six-month prison sentence for the theft of an FN rifle. A substantial amount of rifle ammunition was also taken by IRA members at Foxrock, an affluent suburb of Dublin. A young man from Derry received a six-year sentence for breaking into a gunshop in Tullamore and stealing six firearms including rifles and 12-bore shotguns as well as 12,000 rounds of ammunition. In May 1970, Irish politicians Charles Haughey, Neil Blaney, and John Kelly, Irish Army Captain James Kelly, and Belgian businessman Albert Luykx were acquitted during the Arms Crisis of smuggling weapons to the IRA during the beginning of the conflict.

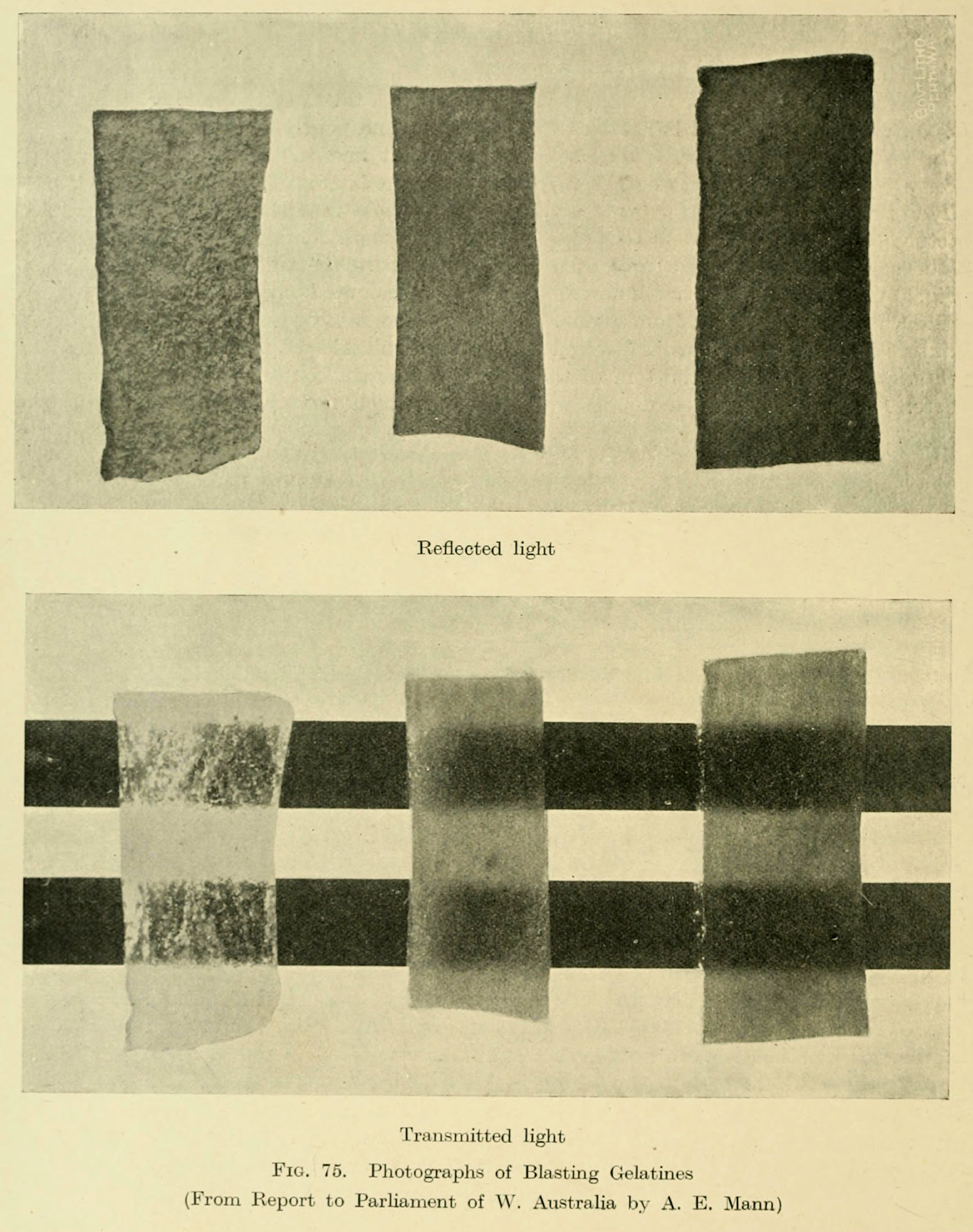
Gelignite was a common explosive obtained by the IRA in the Republic for use in Northern Ireland. For example, it was behind the 48,000lbs of explosives detonated in Northern Ireland in the first six months of 1973 alone.

The primary and prominent source of arms in the Republic for the IRA was explosives. Mines, quarries, farms, and construction sites were where the explosive, gelignite, as well as detonators and safe fuses located. IRA supporters and members who were familiar with these localities began to obtain these types of equipment. In April 1970, for example, three men were arrested in Saggart with six sticks of gelignite, six detonators and four feet of fuse wire. In September 1971, 70 lbs of gelignite, 100 detonators and 200 safety fuses were stolen by the IRA from a line works near Kilmacow, with the help of local supporters who had knowledge of the area. Four months later, the ESB construction site at Turlough Hill was raided with 1,400 lbs of gelignite stolen, considerably more than 200 lbs stolen the previous year. Irish queries found out that ten substantial gelignite raids took place between 1 January 1971 and 12 January 1972. Stratton Mills, MP for Belfast North, said that "there is virtually a gelignite trail across the [Irish] border", comparing it with the famous Ho Chi Minh trail during the Vietnam War. Mills stated that:

[S]ome 60 per cent of the gelignite used in Northern Ireland has come from Southern Ireland [sic], and the security authorities believe that the figure might well be higher than that because of the difficulty of definite identification in all cases. In Northern Ireland steps are taken to control the use and distribution of gelignite. Certain steps have been taken recently in the Republic, but there is a great need for much tighter measures.

After the Irish government began cracking down on commercial explosives, IRA engineers began moving "to develop alternative supplies of explosives" in the Republic of what the media termed "bomb factories", the source for the vast majority of the explosions in the north and against England for the remainder of the conflict. By spring 1972, they successfully manufactured quantities of two types of homemade explosives (HMEs), using mostly commercially available fertilisers and ANFO (a mixture of ammonium nitrate and fuel oil). The British Army estimated by the summer of that year, 90% of the bombings involving HMEs originated from the Republic. These earliest crude devices were unreliable and many IRA volunteers were killed due to premature explosions. As a result, the IRA centralised manufacture of the chief components, and IRA engineers were required to have the training necessary to complete the devices properly. The Hibernia Magazine reported that over 48,000 lbs of explosives had been detonated in Northern Ireland in the first six months of 1973, most of them IRA bombs. The New York Times on September 25, 1979, reported:

Besides rifles and machine guns, which they appear to have in abundance, the Provos’ principal weapons are bombs, like the one that they planted in Lord Mountbatten's fishing boat last month.

In past years, the I.R.A. got a lot of its explosives from the Irish Republic, often in donations from sympathetic builders or quarry operators. But as increased security dried up that source, the Provos have apparently begun manufacturing their own explosives, from commercially available fertilizers.

To accommodate the steady supply of HMEs, the IRA Army Council established dozens of "bomb factories" in the Republic. For example, in 1973, an Irish man secretly representing IRA GHQ leased a factory in an industrial estate near Stannaway Road, County Dublin under the name "Light Machine Services"; it was in fact a secret IRA arms factory, with all employees being IRA members both from the Republic and Northern Ireland. A British report from its Dublin embassy in 1975 identified an IRA arms factory in the north Dublin village of Donabate as "a centre for the manufacture of grenades, rockets and mortars. The Provisionals were careful to work 'nine to five' hours in order not to attract suspicion." It also expressed that "it must be presumed that other factories exist or are planned for this purpose."

By August 1973, Light Machine Services were producing firearms and mortars; the latter was first used against British troops in County Tyrone that year. The result was considered unsatisfactory, so the IRA decided to establish training camps southwest of the Republic specifically to operate mortars. A local retired bachelor farmer in the area allowed the IRA to use his land and farmhouse for billets. From 31 October 1973 to March 1974, these mortar camps were held every four days, while the other three were devoted to manufacturing mortar rounds in the milking parlour and preparing for the next group of recruits. One newspaper at the end of 1973 noted that "nowadays, the Provos have home-produced mortars which are near professional"; they would soon earn the grudging respect of the British Army. These mortars were subsequently used in the 2 May 1974 attack on UDR Clogher barracks, killing Private Eva Martin of the Ulster Defence Regiment (UDR).

British counter-terrorism expert Andy Oppenheimer wrote that:

In the mid-1970s, Irish-origin explosives were still being used in IRA devices and were occasionally turning up on the English mainland. Some could be traced by decoding the markings on the explosives wrappers – pinpointing exactly from which quarry in the Republic it had been acquired. And not only explosives; other bomb components such as casings and micro-electronic switches, timer components and initiation circuitry equipment were found to be in production in factories in Co. Cavan, Dublin, and Dundalk respectively. Some components would be intended for recreational or other use – such as video-gaming machines. Other items in production were a more advanced timing and power unit that could delay an explosion for over five days.

Towards the end of the 1970s, IRA production of HMEs in the Republic continued at a steady pace. IRA fatalities from premature explosions dropped from 31 in 1973 to two or fewer by 1978. Incendiary devices, colloquially referred to as "box bombs" in the conflict, was one of the HMEs produced in large numbers in the Republic. They were eventually used in many IRA attacks on commercial targets, including the La Mon restaurant bombing on 17 February 1978. IRA mortar training in the Republic also continued to show perfect results as well. On 23 January 1978, a number of British soldiers were wounded and had to be airlifted to hospital following an IRA mortar attack on the British Army/RUC base in Forkill, County Armagh. The mortars were fired from a flatbed truck and hit the sleeping quarters. Afterward, three RUC officers were hurt by a booby-trap bomb planted in the truck. Two British soldiers were killed in IRA radio-controlled booby-trap bomb attacks while on foot patrol in Crossmaglen, County Armagh, and Dungannon, County Tyrone on 12 and 19 July 1978 respectively. Again in both cases, these explosives typically originated from the Republic. The following year on 19 March 1979, a British soldier was killed and eight others (including two civilian contractors) injured after a RUC barracks was hit by sustained mortar and rifle fire.

The most successful IRA attack came on 27 August 1979 at Warrenpoint when an IRA unit stationed at the Republic of the border blew up two huge loads of HMEs at a British Army convoy, killing 18 soldiers. In the immediate aftermath, British troops fired across the Newry River into the Republic of Ireland about 3 km from the village of Omeath, County Louth, killing 29-year-old Londoner William Hudson and wounding his cousin Barry Hudson, a 25-year-old Irish native from Dingle. The two civilians were fishing in the area when they were fired upon. However, the attack was overshadowed the same day by the more infamous assassination of Louis Mountbatten. IRA volunteer Thomas McMahon from Monaghan planted a 50 lb gelignite bomb in Shadow V, a 27 feet (8.2 m) fishing boat owned by Louis Mountbatten at Mullaghmore, County Sligo, near Donegal Bay. Mountbatten was killed by the bomb blast along with three other people: Doreen Knatchbull (Mountbatten's elder daughter's mother-in-law); his grandson Nicholas Knatchbull; and a 15-year-old crewmember Paul Maxwell.

Following the assassination, Unionist politician John Taylor assailed the “weak‐kneed Government in Dublin” for poor security, cooperation and extradition common throughout Europe. He said instead of striking enemies within Northern Ireland itself, loyalist paramilitaries should attack the Republic of Ireland in retaliation for IRA attacks originating from that country (e.g., the 1974 Dublin and Monaghan bombings).

=== 1980s ===
HMEs of Irish origin continued to flow into Northern Ireland and England throughout the 1980s. In 1981, a British Home Office report said that 88.7% of explosives used in Northern Ireland originated from the Republic of Ireland: 88% from fertilizers and 0.7% from commercial explosives. As with the previous decade, the IRA relied mostly on fertiliser bombs for the vast majority of its bombing campaign throughout the conflict. A 1982 British Ministry of Defence internal report stated:

[I]n the last year some two in three of the deaths and injuries caused by terrorist bombs have been caused by homemade rather than commercial explosive. In addition the terrorists' continuing capability to manufacture the kind of very large bomb which is put in a culvert or at a roadside seriously hampers the Army's freedom of movement, particularly in the border areas ... As this explosive is derived from agricultural fertiliser manufactured in the Republic, the key to the problem does seem to be to persuade the Irish authorities to stop manufacturing fertiliser based on the present 74% ammonium nitrate 26% calcium carbonate mix. In order to do this we must be able to offer some alternative fertiliser which is satisfactory from the industrial and agricultural point of view but which cannot be rendered into explosive.

That same year, Gardaí seized a large number of chemicals (including sulphuric, nitric acid, ammonium nitrate, and sodium hypochlorite) from Tallaght, much of it which was stolen from the Euro-Chemicals plant in Lucan, to make HMEs. British and Irish officials stated that:

[I]t was agreed that the theft of the chemicals was a further demonstration of the increasing sophistication and scientific ability of the Provisional IRA.

IRA veteran Gerry Kelly recalled how he and other prisoners from the 1983 Maze Prison escape stayed in the homes of prominent homes of Fine Gael and Fianna Fáil members. One other former IRA volunteer said that Fianna Fáil members in County Limerick gave them weapons for the IRA.

A 1985 British Home Office report that more than six tons (12,793lbs) of explosives had either been intercepted or detonated across Northern Ireland. Again, 98% of this was HME that came from agricultural fertilisers in the Republic of Ireland. This resulted in a series of meetings between the Irish Department of Justice and the British Northern Ireland Office.

Despite the 1985 Anglo-Irish Agreement, British intelligence continued to see that the IRA still enjoyed a relatively safe haven in the Republic of Ireland and that "The Irish security forces operating along the Irish border, namely the Irish Army and Garda Síochána, were reportedly 'ill-equipped and not particularly well-motivated to take an active role against the terrorists.'" British Prime Minister Margaret Thatcher regularly blasted Dublin and complained that the IRA was using the border "to move bombs over from the Republic of Ireland or to flee from security forces in Northern Ireland." She continued:

I can't seal the border. There is no way we can patrol the 500 miles ... Everyone there is an open border. I must send more young boys over to their deaths ... There is a borderline there but it is not an effective border.

During the 1987 Remembrance Day bombing, the IRA South Fermanagh Brigade detonated a bomb near the town's war memorial (cenotaph) at the Enniskillen, County Fermanagh in Northern Ireland, killing 12 people and injuring many others. The bomb was assembled in Ballinamore and transported across the border by multiple volunteers operating in relays, and consisted of both HME and Libyan-supplied Semtex. Shortly afterwards, another South Fermanagh Brigade unit abandoned the attempt to detonate a 140lbs HME contained in a beer keg and a plastic container in the village of Tullyhommon, with command wire running across the border to County Donegal.
