= 1973 Old Bailey bombing =

Provisional IRA attack in London, England

1973 Old Bailey Bombing
- Part of the Troubles
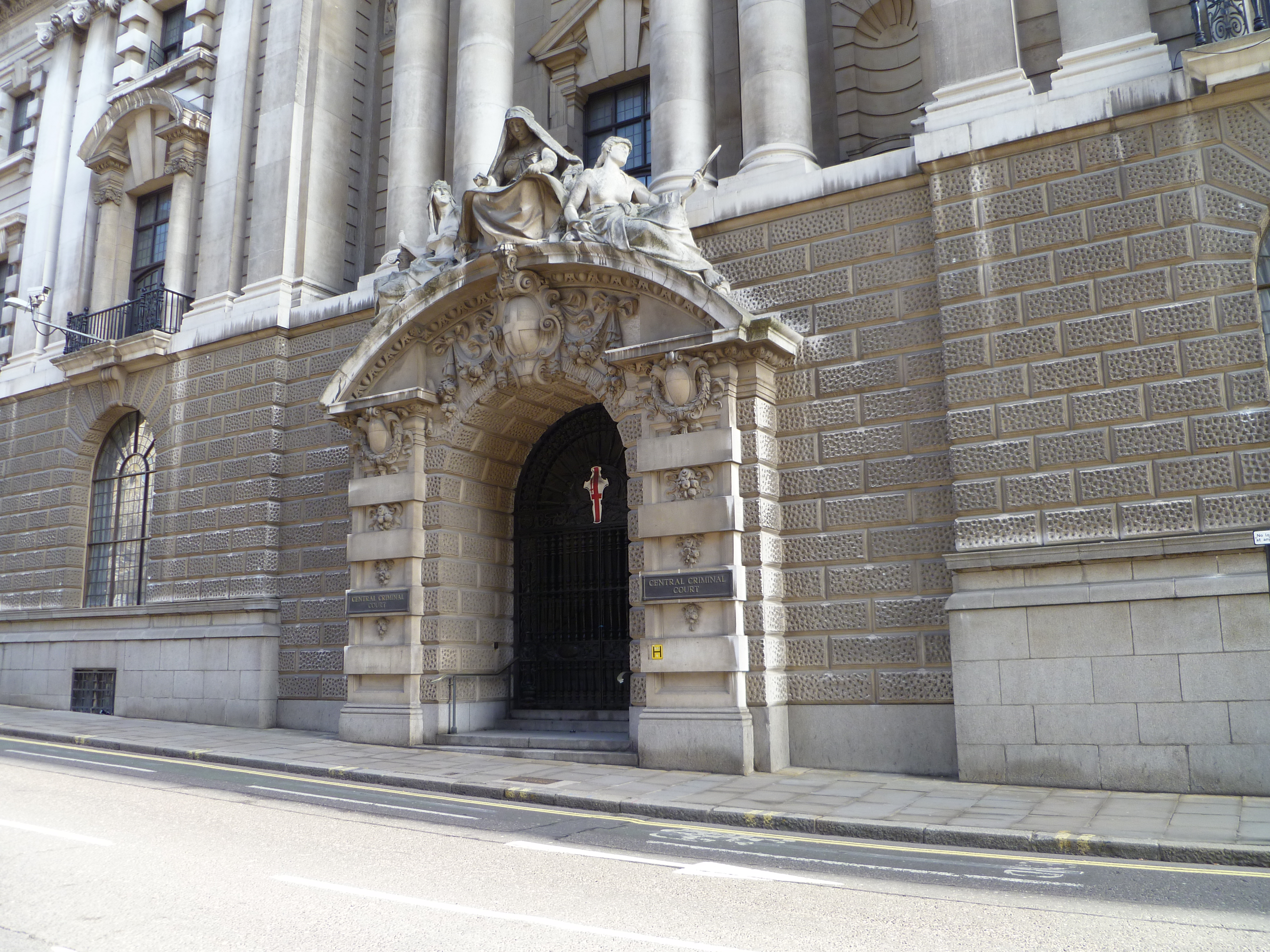
- Entrance door to the Old Bailey
- Location: 51.5158°N 0.1018°W; London, England
- Date: 8 March 1973; 14:49 (UTC)
- Target: Old Bailey Courthouse
- Attack type: Car bomb
- Deaths: 1 British civilian (heart attack)
- Injuries: 243
- Perpetrator: Provisional IRA Belfast Brigade
- Assailants: Hugh Feeney, Gerry Kelly, Dolours Price, Marian Price, Robert Walsh, and other IRA volunteers
- Verdict: life in prison (later reduced to 20 years)
- Convicted: all but McNearney (acquitted for providing information)

A car bomb attack was carried out by the Provisional IRA outside the Old Bailey Courthouse on 8 March 1973. The attack was carried out by an 11-person active service unit (ASU) from the Provisional IRA Belfast Brigade. The unit also exploded a second bomb which went off outside the Ministry of Agriculture near Whitehall in London at around the same time the bomb at the Old Bailey went off.

This was the Provisional IRA's first major attack in England since the Troubles began in the late 1960s. One British civilian died of a heart attack attributed to the bombing. Estimates of the injured range from 180 to 220 from the two bombings. Two additional bombs were found and defused. Nine people from Belfast were convicted six months later for the bombing, one person managed to escape and one was acquitted for providing information to the police.

== Background ==
The Troubles had been ongoing in Northern Ireland and to a lesser extent in the Republic of Ireland since the late 1960s. Rioting, protests, gun battles, sniper attacks, bombings and punishment beatings became part of everyday life in many places in Northern Ireland, especially in the poorer working class areas of Belfast and Derry. These events and others helped to heighten sectarianism and boosted recruitment into Irish republican and Ulster loyalist paramilitary groups and the security forces; mainly the newly created Ulster Defence Regiment.

England had been relatively untouched from the violence up until the beginning of 1973, but the IRA Army Council had drawn up plans for a bombing campaign to take place in England some time early in 1973. In the late 1960s and early 1970s, loyalist paramilitaries had bombed Dublin and other parts of the Republic of Ireland a number of times before the IRA began its bombing campaign in England. Following the Dublin bombings in late 1972 and in January 1973 carried out by Loyalists which killed three people and injured over 150, the media attention these bombings received helped the IRA decide to take its campaign to Britain in return. Billy McKee explained to journalist Peter Taylor that another reason the IRA brought their campaign to England was that the IRA had decided to bomb England early if there was an emergency in the IRA and it began to weaken in Ireland. The arrest of top IRA personnel in both the Republic and Northern Ireland like Máire Drumm, Seán Mac Stíofáin, Ruairí Ó Brádaigh and Martin McGuinness in late 1972 helped to convince the IRA to bomb England to take the heat off of the IRA in Ireland.

The IRA selected the volunteers who would constitute the ASU for the England bombing operation, which was scheduled to take place on 8 March 1973, the same day that as the 1973 Northern Ireland border poll, which was boycotted by Nationalists and Roman Catholics. Volunteers from all three of the IRA's Belfast Brigade Battalions were selected for the bombing mission, the team included 19-year-old Gerry Kelly (a future Sinn Féin MLA), 24-year-old Robert "Roy" Walsh (an expert bomb maker from Belfast), Hugh Feeney (a Belfast-born IRA volunteer and explosives expert), and two sisters, Marian, 19, and Dolours Price, 22, from Belfast who were from a staunchly Republican family, along with five other lesser-known volunteers from Belfast: Martin Brady, 22, William Armstrong, 29, Paul Holmes, 19, William McLarnon, 19, and Roisin McNearney, 18.

== Bombing ==
Several days before the bombing, the leaders of the IRA ASU, which included sisters Marian and Dolours Price, went to London and picked out four targets: the Old Bailey, the Ministry of Agriculture, an army recruitment office near Whitehall and New Scotland Yard. They then reported back to their Officer Commanding in Belfast, and the IRA Army Council gave the go ahead. The bombs were made in Ireland and transported to London via ferry, according to Marian Price.

The Royal Ulster Constabulary warned the British that the ASU was travelling to England, but were unable to provide specifics as to the target.

The drivers and the volunteers who were to prime the bombs woke up at 6:00 a.m. and drove the car bombs to their various targets. Gerry Kelly and Roy Walsh drove their car bomb to the Old Bailey. It was planned that by the time the bombs went off at around 15:00, the ASU would be back in Ireland. The bomb at New Scotland Yard was found at 8:30 by a policeman who noticed a discrepancy in the number plate. The bomb squad started lifting out 5-pound (2.3 kg) bags of explosives and separated them, so that if the bomb did go off, the force of the explosion would be greatly reduced. The bomb squad eventually found the detonating cord leads, which ran under the front passenger seat of the car; Peter Gurney, a senior member of New Scotland Yard, cut the detonator cord leads, defusing the bomb. The bomb at New Scotland Yard weighed 175 lbs of gelignite explosive and the core of the bomb was wired to a time-fuse.

However, at the Old Bailey the bomb exploded, injuring many and causing extensive damage. Scotland Yard stated it had warned the City of London Police at 14:01 to search near the Old Bailey for a green Ford Cortina; the car was not located until 14:35 and exploded at 14:49 while police were evacuating the area. A shard of glass from the explosion is preserved as a reminder, embedded in the wall at the top of the main stairs. Several more people were injured by the car bomb near the Ministry of Agriculture, which brought the total number injured to over 200. A British man, 60-year-old Frederick Milton, died of a heart attack.

Dolours Price wrote in her memoir: "There were warnings phoned in but people had stood about, curious to see... If people ignored the warnings and stood around gawking, they were stupid. The numbers of injured came about through curiosity and stupidity." The ASU was caught trying to leave the country at Heathrow Airport prior to the explosions, as the police had been forewarned about the bombings and were checking all passengers to Belfast and Dublin. All ten gave false names that did not match their documents and they were detained. The IRA Volunteer who gave a warning about the bombs an hour before they exploded was the only one not captured.

== Court and sentence ==
The IRA volunteers had to be tried at Winchester Crown court sitting in Winchester Castle as the Old Bailey was wrecked by the car bomb there. The trial took 10 weeks and was set amid extremely strict security. William McLarnon pleaded guilty to all charges on the first day of the trial. On 14 November 1973, a jury convicted six men and two women of the bombings. The jury acquitted Roisin McNearney in exchange for information and she was given a new identity. As her verdict was handed down, the other defendants began to hum the "Dead March" from Saul, and one threw a coin at her, shouting "Take your blood money with you" as she left the dock in tears. Six of the nine people convicted admitted to Provisional IRA membership.

At the court, the judge sentenced the eight to life imprisonment for the bombings and 20 years for conspiracy, while 19 year old William McLarnon whose family was forced out of their home in August 1969 was sentenced to 15 years, when his sentence was read out he shouted "Up The Provisional IRA". As the eight were led to the cells below the court, several gave raised fist salutes to friends and relatives in the public gallery, who shouted "Keep your chins up" and "All the best".

Initially the Price sisters served their sentence in Brixton Prison. The Price sisters immediately went on hunger strike, soon followed by Feeney and Kelly, for the right not to do prison work and to be repatriated to a jail in Ireland. The bombers on hunger strike were eventually moved to jails in Ireland as part of the 1975 IRA truce agreed with the British.

== Further developments ==
Kelly took part in the 1983 Maze Prison escape. Alongside Brendan McFarlane, Kelly became part of an IRA ASU in the Netherlands; they were captured by the Dutch authorities and extradited.

In 1984 Patrick Brady (36), a civilian milkman and brother of London bomber Martin Brady was murdered by the Ulster Freedom Fighters in Belfast. The Home Office in London refused to allow Martin Brady to attend his brothers funeral at Miltown cemetery in Belfast.

=== Further IRA bombs in England ===
The Old Bailey bomb was the beginning of a sustained bombing campaign in England. The next major bombing by the IRA in England was the King's Cross station and Euston station bombings which injured 13 people and did widespread damage. Another significant attack that year was the 1973 Westminster bombing which injured 60 people. Two more people would die in England from IRA bombings in 1973, bringing the total to three for the year in that part of United Kingdom. The next year 1974, was the bloodiest year of the Troubles outside of Northern Ireland with over 70 people being killed in the Republic of Ireland and England combined. 21 from the Birmingham pub bombings, 12 from the M62 coach bombing and several people were killed by the IRA's Balcombe Street Gang.

One of the Old Bailey bombers Marian Price explained the IRA's reasoning for bombing England. "It doesn't seem to matter if it's Irish people dying." So if the armed struggle was to succeed then it was necessary to "bring it to the heart of the British Establishment" Hence symbolic targets such as the Old Bailey: "the targets were carefully chosen".

== Sources ==
- CAIN project
- Ed Moloney, Voices From The Grave: Two Men's War In Ireland
- Peter Taylor, Behind The Mask: The IRA and Sinn Fein
- Andy Oppenheimer, IRA: The Bombs and the Bullets: A History of Deadly Ingenuity (2008;Irish Academic Press) ISBN 978-0716528951
