= Brendan McFarlane =

Irish republican activist (1951–2025)

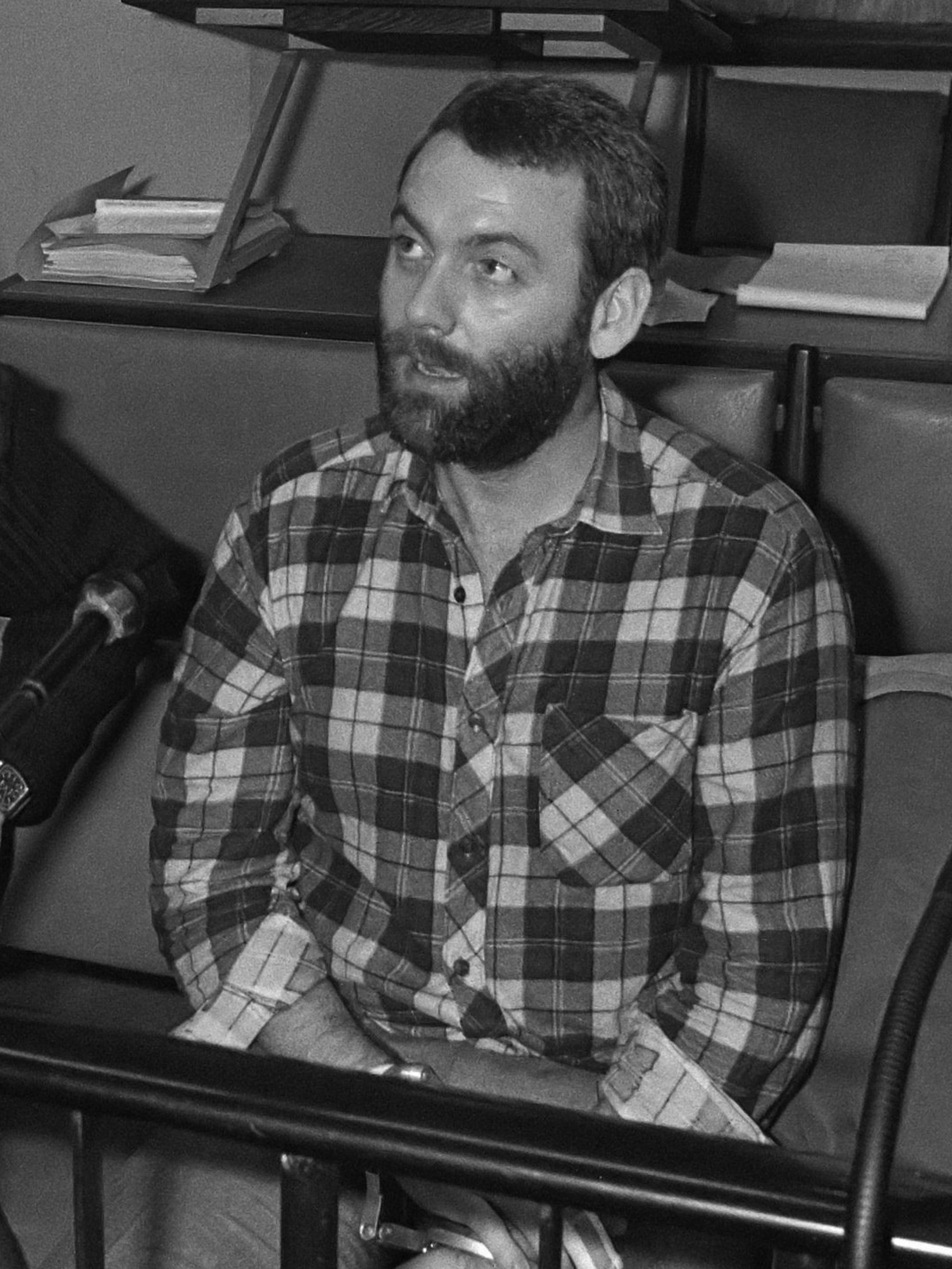
Brendan McFarlane in 1986

Brendan McFarlane (1951 – 21 February 2025) was an Irish republican. Born into a Roman Catholic family, he was brought up in the Ardoyne area of north Belfast, Northern Ireland. At 16, he left Belfast to train as a priest in a north Wales seminary. He joined the Provisional IRA in 1969. In 1976, he was sentenced to life imprisonment for his leading role in the Bayardo Bar attack which left 1 UVF volunteer and 4 civilians dead, injuring 50 others.

== Early years ==
McFarlane was brought up in a strongly religious Catholic family in the Irish Republican Ardoyne area of North Belfast. He served as an altar boy at the local church, and at the age of 17 joined a missionary school in Wales, where he began training to become a priest. McFarlane joined the Provisional IRA when he was 18 years old, following the outbreak of The Troubles, after he had witnessed the violent disturbances first-hand in 1969.

== Bayardo Bar attack ==
In 1976, McFarlane was sentenced to life imprisonment in connection with the Bayardo Bar attack on Aberdeen Street in the Protestant and Loyalist Shankill Road district of Belfast, which killed five people (three men and two women) and injured 60 more on 13 August 1975. In a 1995 House of Lords debate, Gerry Fitt, the SDLP MP for West Belfast at the time of attack, alleged that McFarlane had machine-gunned three pedestrians who were passing by the Bayardo as it was blown up. The bar was attacked because it was allegedly frequented by members of the loyalist Ulster Volunteer Force (UVF). The IRA initially denied it had carried out the attack. The attack occurred against a background of severe sectarian violence. The IRA killed 88 Protestant civilians in similar attacks in 1974–76, in reprisal loyalists attacked Catholic civilians in collusion with the British Armed forces against the Catholic and Nationalist community, which killed 250 civilians in the same period.

According to journalist Peter Taylor, the attack was carried out by the IRA in retaliation for the UVF's ambush of the Dublin-based Miami Showband on 31 July 1975 which had resulted in the shooting deaths of three bandmembers. One of the five people killed in the Bayardo attack was UVF man, Hugh Harris.

== Maze Prison – hunger strikes and escape ==
McFarlane attempted to escape from the Maze Prison dressed as a priest in 1978. When the bid failed, McFarlane's Special Category Status was withdrawn, and he joined the dirty protest in the H-Blocks.

His nickname "Bik" was acquired after the name of a famous Biscuit company MacFarlane Lang, now known as United Biscuits. Fellow prisoner and author of Blanketmen: An Untold Story of the H-Block Hunger Strike, Richard O'Rawe, described McFarlane as "six feet tall and full of bonhomie", a "great singer" possessing a "striking character". O'Rawe also said that McFarlane was an avid supporter of Gaelic football.

He was Provisional IRA Officer Commanding in the Maze during the 1981 Irish hunger strike in which 10 republicans died. He took over from Bobby Sands in March 1981. Asked why he was chosen instead of Séanna Walsh, Sands is said to have replied: "Séanna is my best mate. When a crisis develops, Séanna will not let me die. You will. You have to”. McFarlane later described 1981 as, "probably the worst year of my life. Despite the political gains, the loss of that year is always with me."

McFarlane went on to lead the Maze Prison escape, the mass break-out of 38 republican prisoners from the Maze in 1983 in which a prison officer died of a heart attack. Fifteen IRA men were caught in the vicinity of the prison, four were captured later that day, 19 got away, with three never being recaptured. Immediately following the escape, McFarlane and other prisoners commandeered a remote farmhouse near Dromore, County Down, and held the family inside hostage. Although he took a map and compass, and other items from the premises, none of the family members, which included two small children and a baby, were harmed. He and the other former escapees made their way across the Irish border and went on the run.

After the break-out, McFarlane resumed his IRA activities. In December 1983, he is alleged to have kidnapped supermarket executive Don Tidey in a bid to ransom him to raise money for the IRA. The kidnap was one of spate of kidnappings and robberies ordered by the IRA Army Council in the early 1980s to raise funds. Tidey was taking his 13-year-old daughter to school when he stopped at what he believed to be a Garda Síochána checkpoint. A gun was put to his head and he was bundled into a waiting car. A few days later his photograph was sent to Associated British Foods, and this was followed by a phone call demanding an IR£5 million ransom. The Gardaí eventually tracked Tidey and his kidnappers – four in all – to Derrada Wood in Ballinamore, County Leitrim on 16 December 1983. In the subsequent shoot-out, following which Tidey made his escape, a trainee Garda (Gary Sheehan) and an Irish Army soldier (Patrick Kelly) were killed. Tidey's kidnappers escaped.

On 16 January 1986, McFarlane was recaptured in the Netherlands along with fellow escapee Gerry Kelly, and subsequently extradited to Northern Ireland. By 1993, he had become the longest serving prisoner in the Maze. He was released on parole from the Maze in 1997.

== Kidnapping charges ==
In 1998, McFarlane was first charged in the Republic of Ireland with Tidey's kidnapping, but he challenged this on the basis that Gardaí had lost a number of exhibits containing fingerprints – the central evidence in the case. The Irish Supreme Court ruled in March 2006 that the trial could proceed.

The Gardaí based the Tidey charges on items recovered from the kidnap site, including a milk carton and a plastic container, on which fingerprints were discovered. Although the items went missing from Garda headquarters during renovation work, the fingerprints had been photographed and a forensic analysis done.

McFarlane was due to stand trial on 3 October 2006. However his legal team launched a second judicial review in May 2006, on the grounds that McFarlane could not get a fair trial due to "systematic delays in bringing the prosecution". This held up his trial until the Irish High Court ruled on the issue on 8 December 2006. However, McFarlane's representatives appealed this decision in turn. Their appeal was finally dismissed on 6 March 2008, and the trial opened in Dublin on 11 June 2008 only to collapse on 26 June when the Garda evidence was ruled inadmissible.

In September 2010, McFarlane was awarded compensation following a European Court of Human Rights ruling. The court found the proceedings relating to the kidnapping of supermarket executive Don Tidey had been "unreasonably long". The Irish government was ordered to pay €5,400 in damages within three months and €10,000 in legal costs.

== Other activity ==
In August 2004, Gerry Adams suggested that the IRA might disband to prevent its existence being used as an excuse to delay a power-sharing agreement which would include republicans. An IRA delegation including McFarlane then met with the Provisional IRA South Armagh Brigade to discuss Adams' remarks in an attempt to avoid a rift between the groups.

He became a member of Coiste na n-Iarchimí ("the Ex-Prisoners' Committee"), a welfare organisation for republican ex-prisoners.

Sinn Féin described him as a voluntary worker, and he was a vocal supporter of the party's political stance, appearing beside both Gerry Adams and Gerry Kelly at rallies and reiterating former prisoners' support for the direction the party is taking. In 2017, McFarlane canvassed for Kelly and Carál Ní Chuilín in the 2017 Assembly elections, along with Sinn Féin's deputy leader, Michelle O'Neill.

McFarlane formed a band, Tuan, which is a regular on the Irish republican entertainment circuit. He also performed quite regularly in the Hatfield House, a popular bar in the Holylands district of Belfast. McFarlane sang the closing song at Sinn Féin's St. Patrick's Day Online Concert in 2021.

McFarlane had also shown solidarity with the radical Basque nationalist movement and had been interviewed in the Basque and Spanish press on the subject of the Basque peace process and the proposed release of ETA prisoners. He had described the ETA prisoners as having been engaged in a, 'legitimate struggle' similar to that of Irish republicans.

== Personal life and death ==
McFarlane's grave in Milltown Cemetery, Belfast

McFarlane was married with children and lived in North Belfast. He died on 21 February 2025.

== Cultural references ==
In the 2017 film Maze dramatising the 1983 prison break, directed by Stephen Burke, McFarlane was portrayed by actor Tim Creed.

== See also ==
- McFarlane v Director of Public Prosecutions
