= Roy Walsh =

Provisional IRA volunteer (1949–2024)

- Born: c. September 1949; Lower Falls, Belfast, Northern Ireland
- Died: 16 October 2024 (aged 75); Belfast, Northern Ireland
- Known for: 1973 Old Bailey Bombing
- Military career
- Allegiance: Irish Republic
- Paramilitary: Provisional IRA
- Service years: 1969–1973
- Rank: Volunteer
- Unit: Belfast Brigade
- Conflicts: The Troubles

Roy Walsh (c. September 1949 – 16 October 2024) was a Provisional IRA volunteer. He was convicted for his part in the IRA's 1973 Old Bailey bombing which injured over 200 people.

== IRA activity ==
Walsh joined the IRA in the wake of the August 1969 riots in Belfast in which Bombay Street a Catholic/Nationalist area was burned to the ground by a Loyalist sectarian mob, 1,820 families (mostly Catholics) had to be evacuated and the British Army sent in to keep the peace.

Walsh joined the Belfast Brigade of the Provisional IRA, which in 1973 was allegedly Commanded by Gerry Adams at the time and Adams picked the 11-person Active service unit (ASU) to carry out the 1973 London bombings. Walsh, along with Gerry Kelly, Hugh Feeney, sisters Dolours Price and Marian Price, and six others from the Belfast Brigade made up the rest of the ASU tasked with the London bombings.

Initially six targets in London had been planned to bomb but this was scaled down to four targets, one of which had been picked to bomb was the Old Bailey courthouse; this was the target Roy Walsh was selected to bomb. On 8 March 1973 at about 06:00, Roy Walsh and Gerry Kelly primed their car bomb which weighed about 100 lb and drove to the Old Bailey, three other bombs were planted by other IRA volunteers around London and all timed to go off at roughly the same time.

Before the bomb went off Walsh along with nine other members of his team were caught trying to leave the country at Heathrow Airport and detained there and then. The bomb at the Old Bailey exploded at 14:49 and injured between 180–200 people, one person died of a heart attack attributed to the bomb.

At his trial on 14 November 1973, Roy Walsh received life imprisonment for the bombings and 20 years for conspiracy along with seven other IRA volunteers.

Walsh along with several other IRA prisoners and dozens of inmates was involved in the Albany Prison Riot in May 1983. Several prisoners, prison officers and one warder received minor injuries during the riot.

== Release ==
Walsh was released in 1994, after having served nearly 21 years, making him one of the longest serving IRA prisoners in an English prisons. Only the members of the Balcombe Street Gang served longer sentences.

In an interview with Peter Taylor, Walsh said that he was "shocked that there was so many casualties because our intention was never, never to injure anyone" and that given the warnings, "it was the slowness of the police reactions that caused the injuries." He stated that he did not regret his involvement, but regretted getting caught.

Walsh died in Belfast on 16 October 2024, aged 75.

== Sources ==
- Peter Taylor - Behind The Mask: The IRA and Sinn Fein
- Ruan O'Donnell -Special Category: The IRA IN English Prisons Vol.2: 1978-1985
- CAIN project
