= Patricia Black =

Patricia Black may refer to:

- Patricia Black (Irish republican) (1972–1991), Irish republican
- Patricia Black (actress) (born 1956), American actress
