= Gary Sheehan (police officer) =

Irish police officer

Gary Sheehan (24 September 1960 – 16 December 1983) was an Irish Garda Síochána officer who was killed in an exchange of gunfire with the Provisional Irish Republican Army (IRA) during a hostage rescue operation in County Leitrim in Ireland in 1983.

== Early life ==
A native of Carrickmacross, in County Monaghan, Sheehan had worked as a technician before joining the Garda Síochána in September 1983, being given the service number 23589L. Both his father and grandfather had also been police officers. He was also a member of the Carrick Emmets Gaelic Football team.

== Derrada shooting ==
Sheehan was still a probationary Garda, three months into his service and in training at the Garda College at Templemore, when he was deployed in a joint police and Irish Defence Forces search for Don Tidey, Managing Director of the Quinnsworth supermarket chain, who had been kidnapped in the southern outskirts of Dublin for ransom by the IRA to raise finance for its paramilitary activities.

A nationwide manhunt of four weeks gained intelligence information which narrowed the search to the area near Ballinamore in the southeast of County Leitrim. On the afternoon of 16 December 1983, Sheehan and Private Kelly, a soldier in the Irish Army, were part of a joint forces team searching with dogs through Drumcromin Wood, at Derrada, near Ballinamore, when they found the IRA kidnap gang's hideout location, and were shot dead (Sheehan being hit in the head) in an intense exchange of small arms fire with it, during which hand-grenades were also thrown. Tidey was subsequently found nearby and rescued, the IRA gang fleeing the scene, managing to escape, shooting and wounding another Garda officer in the process.

== Memorial ==
Sheehan was buried at Carrickmacross cemetery. In 2021 he was posthumously awarded the highest, gold, version of the Scott Medal, the Garda bravery award.

== Suspects and subsequent related prosecutions ==
Though the IRA paramilitary Brendan McFarlane is believed by Garda sources to have led the kidnap gang, no one has been charged with the murders. McFarlane was prosecuted for the kidnapping at Dublin's Special Criminal Court in 2008, but the case collapsed and McFarlane was awarded legal costs and damages.

== See also ==
- List of Gardaí killed in the line of duty
