= La Mon restaurant bombing =

Bomb attack in Northern Ireland

- Part of the Troubles
- Location of the bombing (red dot) in relation to Belfast (pink) La Mon restaurant bombing (County Down) La Mon restaurant bombing (Northern Ireland)
- Location: 54°32′53″N 05°49′04″W; Comber, County Down, Northern Ireland
- Date: 17 February 1978; 21:00 (GMT)
- Attack type: Bombing
- Weapon: Incendiary bomb
- Deaths: 12
- Injuries: 30
- Perpetrators: Provisional Irish Republican Army; Belfast Brigade

On 17 February 1978, the Provisional IRA's Belfast Brigade left a large incendiary bomb outside the La Mon House hotel and restaurant in Comber, County Down, Northern Ireland. The attack, commonly known as the La Mon restaurant bombing, has been described as one of the worst atrocities of the Troubles.

The bomb, containing a napalm-like substance, was left outside one of the restaurant's windows. At the time of the attack, 450 diners, hotel staff, and guests were inside of the building. The IRA stated they tried to send a warning from a public telephone, but were unable to do so until nine minutes before the bomb detonated. The blast created a fireball, killing 12 people and injuring 30 more, many of whom were severely burnt. Many of the injured were treated in the Ulster Hospital in nearby Dundonald.

A Belfast native, Robert Murphy, received twelve life sentences in 1981 for the manslaughter of those who were killed. Murphy was freed from prison on licence in 1995.

== Bombing ==
=== The bomb ===
On 17 February 1978, an IRA active service unit planted an incendiary bomb attached to petrol-filled canisters on meat hooks outside the window of the Peacock Room in the restaurant of the La Mon House Hotel, located at Comber, County Down, about 6 miles (9.7 km) southeast of central Belfast.

The device was of a type mass-produced clandestinely in the Republic of Ireland (see Provisional IRA in the Republic of Ireland), colloquially referred to as "box bombs". A small blast bomb attached to four large petrol canisters, each filled with a homemade napalm-like substance of petrol and sugar. The mixture was designed to stick to whatever it hit and cause severe burn injuries. According to a retired RUC Detective Superintendent, these devices had already been used by the IRA in more than one hundred attacks on commercial buildings before the La Mon attack.

=== Warnings ===
After planting the bomb, the IRA members tried to send a warning from the nearest public telephone, but found that it had been vandalised. On their way to another telephone, they were further delayed when forced to stop at an Ulster Defence Regiment (UDR) checkpoint.

By the time they were able to send the warning, only nine minutes remained before the bomb exploded at 21:00. The Royal Ulster Constabulary (RUC) base at Newtownards had received two further telephone warnings at 20:57 and 21:04. By the time the latter call came in, it was too late. When an officer telephoned the restaurant to issue the warning he was told "For God's sake, get out here – a bomb has exploded!" It has been stated that the IRA were targeting RUC officers they believed were meeting in the restaurant that night, but had got the wrong date and that the meeting of RUC officers had taken place exactly a week before.

=== Explosion and fireball ===
That evening the two main adjoining function rooms, the Peacock Room and Gransha Room, were packed with people of all ages attending dinner dances. Including the hotel guests and staff, there was a total of 450 people inside the building. The diners had just finished their first course when the bomb detonated, shattering the window outside of which it was attached and vaporising the canisters. The explosion created an instantaneous and devastating fireball of blazing petrol, 40 feet (12 m) high and 60 feet (18 m) wide, which engulfed the Peacock Room.

Twelve people were killed, having been virtually burnt alive, and some 30 others were injured, many critically. Some of the wounded lost limbs, and most received severe burns. One badly burnt survivor described the inferno inside the restaurant as "like a scene from hell" whilst another said the blast was "like the sun had exploded in front of my eyes". There was further pandemonium after the lights went out and choking black smoke filled the room. The survivors, with their hair and clothing on fire, rushed to escape the burning room. It took firemen almost two hours to put out the blaze.

The dead were all Protestant civilians. Half were young married couples. Most of the dead and injured were members of the Irish Collie Club and the Northern Ireland Junior Motor Cycle Club, holding their yearly dinner dances in the Peacock Room and Gransha Room, respectively. The former took the full force of the explosion and subsequent fire; many of those who died had been seated nearest the window where the bomb had gone off. Some of the injured were still receiving treatment 20 years later.

The victims were found beneath a pile of hot ash and charred beyond recognition. Identification was proven extremely difficult as their individual features had been completely burned away. Some of the bodies had shrunk so much in the intense heat, it was first believed that there were children among the victims. One doctor who saw the remains described them as being like "charred logs of wood".

== Aftermath ==
The day after the explosion, the IRA admitted responsibility and apologised for the inadequate warning. The hotel had allegedly been targeted by the IRA as part of its firebomb campaign against commercial targets. Since the beginning of its campaign, it had carried out numerous such attacks with the stated goal of harming the economy and causing disruption, which it believed would put pressure on the British Government to withdraw from Northern Ireland. The resulting carnage brought quick condemnation from other Irish nationalists, with one popular newspaper comparing the attack to the 1971 McGurk's Bar bombing. Sinn Féin president Ruairí Ó Brádaigh also strongly criticised the operation. In consequence of the botched warning, the IRA Army Council gave strict instructions to all units not to bomb buses, trains or hotels.

As all the victims had been Protestant, many Protestants saw the bombing as a sectarian attack against their community. Some unionists called for the return of the death penalty, with one unionist politician calling for republican areas to be bombed by the Royal Air Force. The same day, about 2,000 people attended a lunchtime service organised by the Orange Order at Belfast City Hall. Belfast International Airport shut for an hour, while many workers in Belfast and Larne stopped work for a time. Workers at a number of factories said they were contributing a half-day's pay to a fund for the victims. Ulster loyalists criticised the then Secretary of State for Northern Ireland, Roy Mason, for his "complacent attitude" to the attack. He stated that the explosion was "an act of criminal irresponsibility" performed "by remnants of IRA gangs". He also stated that the IRA was on the decline.

A team of 100 RUC detectives was deployed in the investigation. As part of the investigation, 25 people were arrested in Belfast, including Gerry Adams. Adams was released from custody in July 1978. Two prosecutions followed. One Belfast man was charged with twelve murders but was acquitted. He was convicted of IRA membership but successfully appealed. In September 1981, another Belfast man, Robert Murphy, was given twelve life sentences for the manslaughter of those who died. Murphy was freed on licence in 1995. As part of their bid to catch the bombers, the RUC passed out leaflets which displayed a graphic photograph of a victim's charred remains.

In 2012, a news article quoting unnamed Republican sources stated that two members of the IRA bombing team, including the getaway driver, were double agents working for the Special Branch. According to the article, one of the agents was Denis Donaldson. That year, Northern Ireland's Historical Enquiries Team (HET) completed a report on the bombing. It revealed that important police documents, including interviews with IRA members, have been lost. A number of the victims' families criticised the report and called for a public inquiry. They stated the documents had been removed to protect certain IRA members. Unionist politician Jim Allister, who had been supporting the families, said: "There is a prevalent belief that someone involved was an agent and that is an issue around which we need clarity".
