= Killing of Patrick Kelly =

1983 death

Pte Patrick Kelly (10 May 1948 – 16 December 1983) was an Irish Army private in the Defence Forces killed during the rescue of kidnapped supermarket executive Don Tidey. He was posthumously awarded the Military Star decoration.

== Family life ==
Patrick Kelly was a native of Moate, County Westmeath. He was married and a father of four sons, ranging in ages from nine years to eleven weeks at the time of his death.

== Death ==
In December 1983, Private Kelly was killed in the line of duty along with trainee Garda Gary Sheehan while both were involved in the rescue of Don Tidey, at Derrada Wood, Ballinamore, County Leitrim.

== Justice campaign ==
A 2008 trial of Brendan McFarlane, related to the abduction of Tidey, collapsed after incriminating statements McFarlane allegedly made following his arrest were ruled inadmissible. No-one was ever convicted of the soldier's killing.

During the 2011 Irish presidential election Kelly's eldest son, David, confronted Sinn Féin candidate and former IRA commander, Martin McGuinness. McGuinness denied knowing the killers or that he was a member of the IRA Army Council at the time. Kelly called him a liar, saying that before there could be any reconciliation, there had to be truth, and "I want truth today. Murder is murder. I want justice for my father." He later described McGuinness' presidential bid as an "obscenity, because his organisation killed members of the security forces... I feel sympathy for all people who were killed by the Provisional IRA over the years - Detective Garda Jerry McCabe in Limerick and all the other people." McGuinness later responded, stating that "As a republican leader I have never and would never stand over attacks on the Garda Síochána or the Defence Forces." However, he refused to condemn the killings of Kelly and Sheehan.

== Legacy ==
In 2008, on the 25th anniversary of his death, a plaque was unveiled in his honour in his home town of Moate. Kelly's family including his widow Catriona attended, as did Don Tidey.

On 16 July 2012, Kelly was posthumously awarded the Military Star by Minister for Justice and Equality and Defence Alan Shatter, almost 30 years after his killing.

== See also ==
- Michael J. Reynolds, killed by republicans, 1975
- Deaths of Henry Byrne and John Morley, killed by the INLA, 1980
- Death of Jerry McCabe, Garda killed by the IRA, 1996
