= McFarlane v Director of Public Prosecutions =

Irish Supreme Court case

McFarlane v DPP
- Coat of arms of Ireland
- Court: Supreme Court of Ireland
- Full case name: McFarlane v Director of Public Prosecutions (DPP)
- Decided: 5 March 2008
- Citation: [2008] IESC 7; [2008] 4 IR 117

Case history
- Appealed from: High Court
- Appealed to: Supreme Court

Court membership
- Judges sitting: Hardiman J., Georghegan J., Fennelly J., Kearns J., Macken J.

Case opinions
- An appeal evaluating the various types of delay, and the development of a test establishing whether the delay can be deemed reasonable.
- Decision by: Kearns J.

Keywords
- Constitution; Personal Rights; Right to fair trial; Criminal; IRA

McFarlane v Director of Public Prosecutions [2008] IESC 7; [2008] 2 I.R. 117 is an Irish Supreme Court case in which the Court ruled that the right to a fair trial under both Article 38.1 of the Constitution and Article 6(1) of the European Convention on Human Rights does not preclude prosecution in cases of prosecutorial delay unless the accused can demonstrate either that some specific prejudice resulted or that the delay was well outside the norm for the particular proceedings.

== Background ==
Ireland's best known businessman in the 1980s, Mr. Don Tidey, was kidnapped and held captive at a hideout in a wooded area. He remained in Derrada Wood, Drumcroman, Ballinamore, Country Leitrim from 24 November to 16 December (1983). On the day of Mr. Tidey's rescue (led by the Irish Police; An Gardaí), there was a shoot-out, during which a garda recruit and an army private were shot dead. The kidnappers managed to escape, leaving behind certain objects upon which fingerprints were found. The applicant in this case was a prime suspect in the garda investigation which ensued.

The applicant, Brendan “Bik” McFarlane, at the time of the kidnapping, had been a prisoner in Northern Ireland since 1975 for partaking in the IRA bombing of a bar on Shankill Road, located in Belfast. Five people were killed in this incident. At the time of Mr.Tidey's abduction, the applicant had escaped from the Maze Prison, along with other prisoners. In January 1986, the applicant was arrested in The Netherlands, where he was found in possession of falsified Irish passport. He was extradited from the Netherlands and returned to Northern Ireland. In 1998, McFarlane was arrested in the Republic of Ireland, under the Offenses Against the State Act 1993, S.30. He was later charged with both the unlawful possession of a firearm and the false imprisonment of Don Tidey.

=== First Prohibition ===
The fingerprint evidence that had been found at the scene of the abduction, at the Derrada wood, had been lost by Gardaí. The applicant avoided prosecution, and the High Court ordered a prohibition of trial. Prohibition of trial may be granted if there is a possibility of an unfair trial. The right to fair trial is guaranteed under Article 38.1 of the Irish Constitution.

The court agreed that there was in fact a risk of unfair trial due to the misplacing of the evidence against the applicant, McFarlane. The prosecution appealed the High Court's decision. The Supreme Court ruled in favour of the prosecution's appeal, resulting in McFarlane's cross-appeal being refused. The court found that although the evidence had been lost, there was still photographic evidence of the prints, and all the forensic examination of the fingerprints had been completed before the items were lost. The Supreme Court had thus concluded there was no risk of an unfair trial. Article 38.1 of the Constitution has not been breached.

A prohibiting order prevents a public body or court from acting beyond its powers in the future. There was a delay before his arrest. However, the judges found that it was insufficient an issue to grant a prohibition. They found that it was in fact legitimate for the Irish police to have waited for the prison in the North to release him before he could be arrested in the Republic.

=== Second Prohibition ===
After the initial prohibition was lifted, McFarlane sought a second prohibition order on 15 May 2006. In this action, he argued the delay dating back to November 1999 (during his initial prohibition action). He argued that his constitutional right to a trial with reasonable expedition had been breached, and so he was exposed the risk of an unfair trial. He claimed a systematic delay. A systematic delay arises when the State fails to provide the adequate resources for the litigation process.

The prosecution had been delayed by 6 years, since the initial judicial review was brought. However, given the serious nature of his crimes, the High Court refused his application for a prohibition. McFarlane Appealed in February 2007. The Supreme Court heard the appeal January 2008.

== Holding of the Supreme Court ==
The Supreme Court dismissed the appeal unanimously. The applicant failed to prove that he was prejudiced by the delay. Hence, there was no demonstration that there had been a breach of his constitutional right to a trial in due course of law.

=== Types of Delay ===
The types of delay that were considered by the court during the proceedings of this case: Prosecutorial delay and Systematic delay.

Prosecutorial delay - Delay arising from the police investigating crimes tardily, or reporting the crime to the prosecuting authorities tardily.

Systematic delay - Delay arising when the State fails to provide "adequate resources or facilities for the disposal of litigation". This type of delay may overlap with prosecutorial delay. This delay is really important because by failing to provide the necessary resources for trial, such as fingerprints analysis, the case would be hindered.

==== Prosecutorial Delay ====
Article 38.1 of the Constitution states that; "No person shall be tried on any criminal charge save in due course of law." The Court considered two circumstances in which a lengthy lapse of time between being arrested and being formally charged could result in a risk of the accused having an unfair trial. Where the applicant might be able to establish a real risk of a particular prejudice against him, rendering the trial unfair, and where the excessive amount of time in itself might "raise an inference that the risk of an unfair trial arose as a reality."

The Court turned for guidance to "the U.S' constitutional guarantee of a speedy trial which the court deemed not dissimilar to Article 38.1. The court cited the decision of U.S Supreme Court, Barker v Wingo, in which it was emphasised that the right to a speedy trial was a somewhat flexible rule, and that each case must be met on an ad hoc basis. The conduct of both the prosecution, and that of the defendant had to be equally weighed. The court then laid out the four factors to be "assessed when determining whether a particular defendant had been deprived of his constitutional right to a speedy trial guaranteed by the Sixth Amendment to the U.S. Constitution." They are as follows;

1. The length of the delay.
2. Reasons for the delay.
3. The role of the applicant - The applicant must assert his right to a speedy trial. Failing to assert the right could result in the application being made more difficult.
4. Prejudice - The court has identified three interests of the defendant, which were intended to be protected by the right to a speedy trial;"(i) The prevention of oppressive pre-trial incarceration; (ii) The reduction of anxiety and concern of the accused; and (iii) The limitation of the possibility that the defense will be impaired."

The Irish Supreme Court analysed whether a systematic delay could be viewed as being qualitatively different from a prosecution delay and concluded that they are governed by the same principles. The reasoning behind this being that both forms of delay affect an accused in the same manner. The case would still be hindered, in all aspects.

A delay between being arrested and charged would cause stress regarding the type of charge that would occur. Furthermore, adequate resources such as fingerprints analysis should always be submitted to the court. The court found this view to be concerning with that of 'Barker v Wingo', and in this jurisdiction, by 'DPP V Byrne'. In 'DPP v Byrne', there were a number of factors that must be considered to determine the risk of an unfair trial. Was the delay involved in the investigation was inordinate and inexcusable. Was there real anxiety or concern caused to the applicant during the lengthy period in question.

Types of Systematic Delay:

- Failure by state to provide an adequate amount of court room facilities, judges, back-up staff, or "any other assistance needed to enable the criminal process from moving forward with reasonable expedition."
- Failure by the judges to deliver a judgement within reasonable time.

In all cases, the European Court of Human Rights (ECHR) established that a State is obliged to create an organized legal system allowing its courts to comply with article 6, in that all citizens are entitled to a fair trial, all within reasonable time. This requirement is not compromised by, and does not cease to exist because of domestic law requiring parties to take the initiative to progress their proceedings.

== Subsequent developments ==
Subsequent to the Supreme Court dismissing the appeal unanimously in 2008, the proceedings were reinstated before the Special Criminal Court. Ultimately the entire case collapsed when the court ruled that the evidence provided by garda was inadmissible. The prosecution did not bring forth further evidence. The charges against McFarlane were dismissed, despite this, he brought a case against the state before the ECHR in Strasbourg.
