= Coiste na nIarchimí =

Coiste na nIarchimí (Ex-Prisoner's Committee) is an organisation founded in 1998 to facilitate the reintegration of Irish Republican released prisoners of The Troubles.
