= Bayardo Bar attack =

1975 terrorist attack in Northern Ireland

- Part of The Troubles
- Location: 54°36′14″N 5°56′53″W; Bayardo Bar; Aberdeen Street, Belfast, Northern Ireland
- Date: 13 August 1975
- Attack type: shooting, bombing
- Deaths: 5 (4 Protestant civilians, 1 Ulster Volunteer Force member)
- Injuries: 50+
- Perpetrator: Provisional IRA Belfast Brigade

The Bayardo Bar attack took place on 13 August 1975 in Belfast, Northern Ireland. A unit of the Provisional Irish Republican Army (IRA), led by Brendan McFarlane, launched a bombing and shooting attack on a pub on Aberdeen Street, in the loyalist Shankill area. IRA members stated the pub was targeted because it was frequented by members of the Ulster Volunteer Force (UVF). Four Protestant civilians and one UVF member were killed, while more than fifty were injured.

According to journalists Alan Murray and Peter Taylor, it was a retaliation for the Miami Showband massacre almost a fortnight earlier when members of the popular Dublin-based band were shot dead by the UVF at a fake military checkpoint.

McFarlane and two other IRA volunteers, Peter "Skeet" Hamilton and Seamus Clarke, were sentenced to life imprisonment for perpetrating the Bayardo attack.

== Background ==
By the year 1975, the conflict in Northern Ireland, known as the Troubles, was more than six years old. On 10 February 1975, the Provisional IRA and the British government entered into a truce and restarted negotiations. The IRA agreed to halt attacks on the British security forces, and the security forces mostly ended its raids and searches. However, there were dissenters on both sides. Some Provisionals wanted no part of the truce, while British commanders resented being told to stop their operations against the IRA just when they thought they had the IRA on the run. The security forces boosted their intelligence offensive during the truce and thoroughly infiltrated the IRA.

There was a rise in sectarian killings during the truce, which 'officially' lasted until early 1976. Ulster loyalists, fearing they were about to be forsaken by the British government and forced into a united Ireland, increased their attacks on Irish Catholics/nationalists. They hoped to force the IRA to retaliate and thus end the truce. Under orders not to engage the security forces, some IRA units concentrated on tackling the loyalists. The fall-off of regular operations had caused unruliness within the IRA and some members, with or without permission from higher up, engaged in tit-for-tat killings.

In the early hours of 31 July 1975, the popular Miami Showband was driving back to Dublin following a gig in Banbridge. At Buskhill (outside Newry) they were stopped at a checkpoint by Ulster Volunteer Force (UVF) gunmen wearing British Army uniforms. Some of the gunmen were Ulster Defence Regiment soldiers. The gunmen ordered the group to line up, facing a ditch. As one gunman took the names and addresses of the band members, two others hid a bomb under the driver's seat of their minibus. However, the bomb detonated prematurely, and the two men were blown to pieces. The surviving gunmen then opened fire on the five band members, killing three and wounding two. According to journalists Peter Taylor and Alan Murray, the attack on the Bayardo was retaliation for the massacre.

== The attack ==
The Bayardo Bar was crowded with people of all ages on Wednesday 13 August 1975. Shortly before closing time a stolen green Audi car, containing a three-man unit of the IRA's Belfast Brigade, pulled up outside. It was driven by the unit's leader Brendan "Bik" McFarlane, a 24-year-old volunteer from Ardoyne. Volunteers Seamus Clarke and Peter "Skeet" Hamilton got out and approached the pub's side entrance on Aberdeen Street. One of them immediately opened fire with an Armalite, instantly killing doorman William Gracey (63) and his brother-in-law Samuel Gunning (55), with whom he had been chatting outside. The other volunteer then entered the pub, where patrons were drinking and singing, and at the entrance, he dropped a duffel bag containing a ten-pound bomb. Both men made their getaway back to the waiting car. As panicked customers ran to the toilets for safety, the bomb exploded and brought down a section of the old brick-and-plaster building upon them. The bodies of civilian Joanne McDowell (29) and UVF member Hugh Harris (21) were later found beneath the rubble of fallen masonry. Seventeen-year-old civilian Linda Boyle was pulled out alive, but died of her injuries in hospital on 21 August. Over 50 people were injured in the attack.

A Belfast Telegraph article later stated that, as the IRA unit drove away down Agnes Street (an arterial road linking the Shankill to the Crumlin Road), they fired into a crowd of women and children queuing at a taxi rank; there were no fatalities. Within 20 minutes of the blast, the IRA unit was arrested after their car was stopped at a roadblock. The Armalite that had been used to kill William Gracey and Samuel Gunning was found inside the car along with spent bullet cases and fingerprints belonging to the three IRA men.

The IRA did not initially claim responsibility, However, IRA members later stated that the Bayardo was attacked because it was a pub where UVF members met and planned terrorist assaults against nationalists. Martin Dillon said that the Bayardo was frequented by the UVF and that Lenny Murphy, head of the Shankill Butchers gang, was a regular customer. Steve Bruce also maintained that in the early 1970s, the UVF's Brigade Staff (Belfast leadership) would often be found drinking in the pub, which was just around the corner from their headquarters above "The Eagle" chip shop on the Shankill Road. A former IRA prisoner stated that fellow inmate Lenny Murphy told him he had left the Bayardo ten minutes before the attack and that the Brigade Staff had just finished holding a meeting there.

== Retaliation ==
Loyalists, especially the UVF, responded with another wave of sectarian attacks against Catholics. Two days after, a loyalist car bomb exploded without warning on the Falls Road, injuring 35 people. On 22 August, the UVF launched a gun and bomb attack on McGleenan's Bar in Armagh. The attack was strikingly similar to that at Bayardo. One gunman opened fire while another planted the bomb; the explosion caused the building to collapse. Three Catholic civilians were killed (one of whom died on 28 August) and several more were wounded. That same night, another bomb wrecked a Catholic-owned pub in nearby Blackwatertown, although there were no injuries.

These loyalist attacks were responded to in kind by the IRA (sometimes using the cover name "Republican Action Force"), with the months that followed the Bayardo attack being characterised as a bloody game of tit-for-tat. This was met with disillusionment by imprisoned republicans such as Gerry Adams and Brendan Hughes, with the latter stating that sectarianism was "destroying the whole struggle".

== Convictions ==
In May 1976, Brendan McFarlane, Seamus Clarke, and Peter Hamilton were convicted in a non-jury Diplock Court and sentenced to life imprisonment inside the Maze Prison for carrying out the Bayardo murders. Inside the Maze, McFarlane rose to become officer commanding IRA prisoners and in 1983 he led the Maze Prison escape, which was the mass break-out of 38 republican prisoners, including Clarke and Hamilton. McFarlane and Clarke then went on the run, although Hamilton was immediately recaptured outside the prison's main perimeter gate. McFarlane has never spoken about the killings, and the IRA leadership has never encouraged him to do so, considering the attack was viewed as having been "purely sectarian". Sinn Féin president Gerry Adams, however, told journalist Alan Murray that McFarlane "hadn't a single, sectarian bone in his body". Peter "Skeet" Hamilton died of cancer in Dundalk on 25 February 2011 at the age of 57.

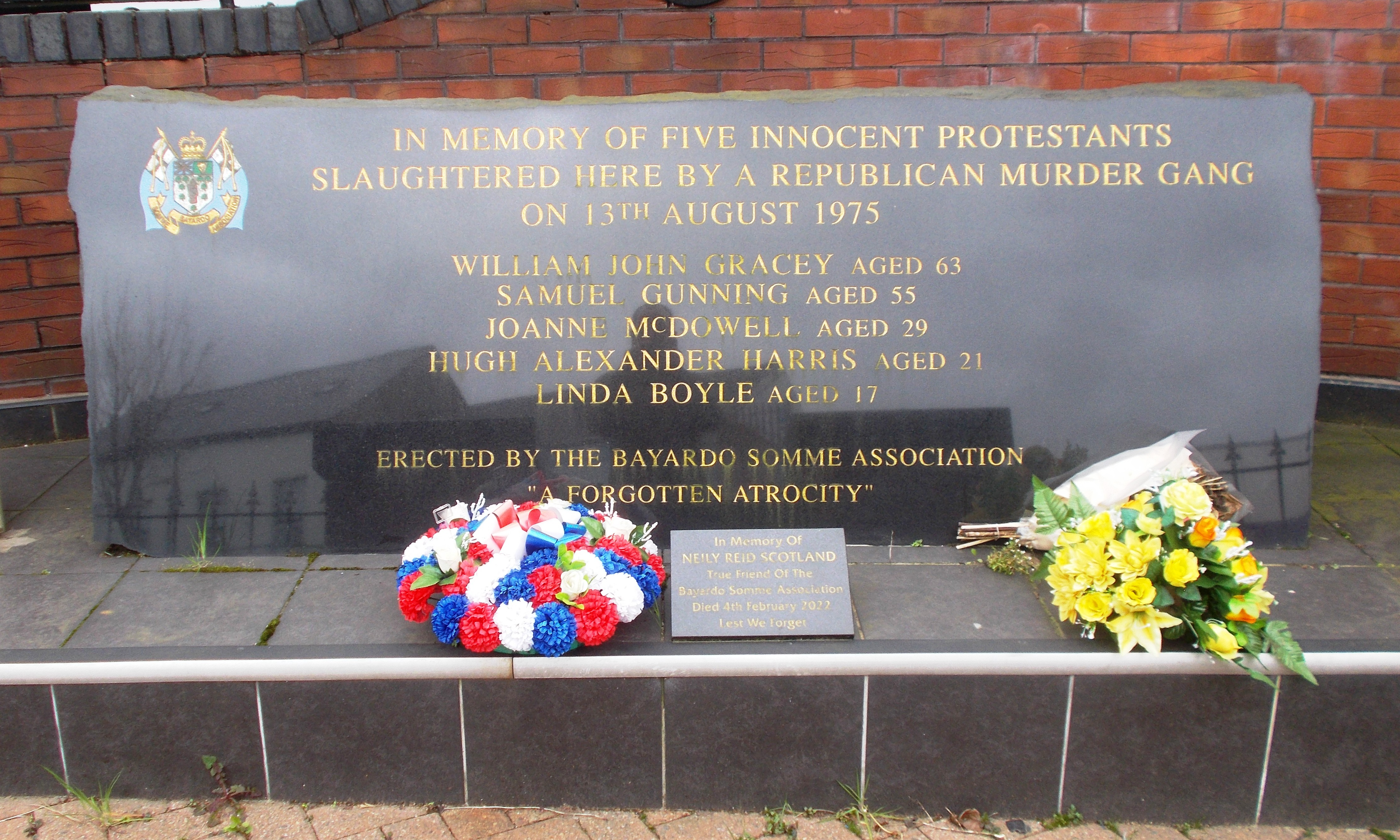
Memorial to the victims of the Bayardo Bar attack

The Bayardo Somme Association has described the Bayardo attack as "a forgotten atrocity". The association erected a memorial to the victims on the site where the Bayardo Bar stood before its demolition. The large steel monument was incorporated into the remaining section of the original structure; it bears the names and photographs of the five people who were killed plus photos of the pub taken before and after the bombing.

== See also ==
- Chronology of Provisional Irish Republican Army actions (1970–1979)
