= Patricia Black (Irish republican) =

Irish Republican volunteer (1972–1991)

- Born: 28 November 1972; Belfast, Northern Ireland
- Died: 15 November 1991 (aged 18); St Albans, England
- Military career
- Allegiance: Provisional Irish Republican Army
- Service years: 1990 - 1991
- Rank: Volunteer
- Unit: Belfast Brigade

Patricia Black or Patricia Black-Donnelly (28 November 1972 – 15 November 1991) was a Volunteer in the Belfast Brigade of the Provisional Irish Republican Army (IRA). She was killed on 15 November 1991 in St Albans when a bomb she was carrying exploded prematurely. Born in West Belfast, her family were ignorant of her republican involvement. Having joined the IRA in 1990, the following year she was sent to England as a sleeper agent, moving to Manchester and then to London. Here she associated with another volunteer, Frank Ryan, with whom she went to St Albans, Hertfordshire, in November 1991. They intended to plant a bomb—probably because there was a charity concert performance by the Blues and Royals regimental band of the British Army. The bomb exploded prematurely, however, and both were killed immediately. Identification was impossible. Her remains were returned to Belfast where her family refused to allow a paramilitary-style funeral. She has been commemorated on Belfast murals and by Republican music groups since.

== Early life ==
Black, the second of four children, was born in 1972 and grew up in the Lenadoon area of Belfast, a sprawling council estate with a high level of unemployment. She was educated at St. Oliver Plunkett Primary School and St Genevieve's High School for Girls in Andersonstown, which she left at 16. As a youth, she regularly complained of harassment from army patrols. She was later described as being approximately 5 feet 2 inches (1.57 m), medium build, permed curly dark brown hair with dark eyes. Her parents had separated by the time she moved to England.

== IRA career ==
Patricia joined the IRA on her 18th birthday. She informed her mother that she was moving to Dublin but secretly moved to London. It is unknown whether she rented her own accommodation or had been provided with a safe house; she was later suspected of living in North London. She may also have rented a garage. A sleeper, or cleanskin, she lived in Manchester between September 1989 to June 1990; although there was IRA activity in the city around this time—for example, incendiary devices were found in the Arndale Centre—Black is not thought to have been involved. She had no police record and was unknown to the security services, and it was later suggested that she was chosen for active service abroad on this account.

=== St Albans ===
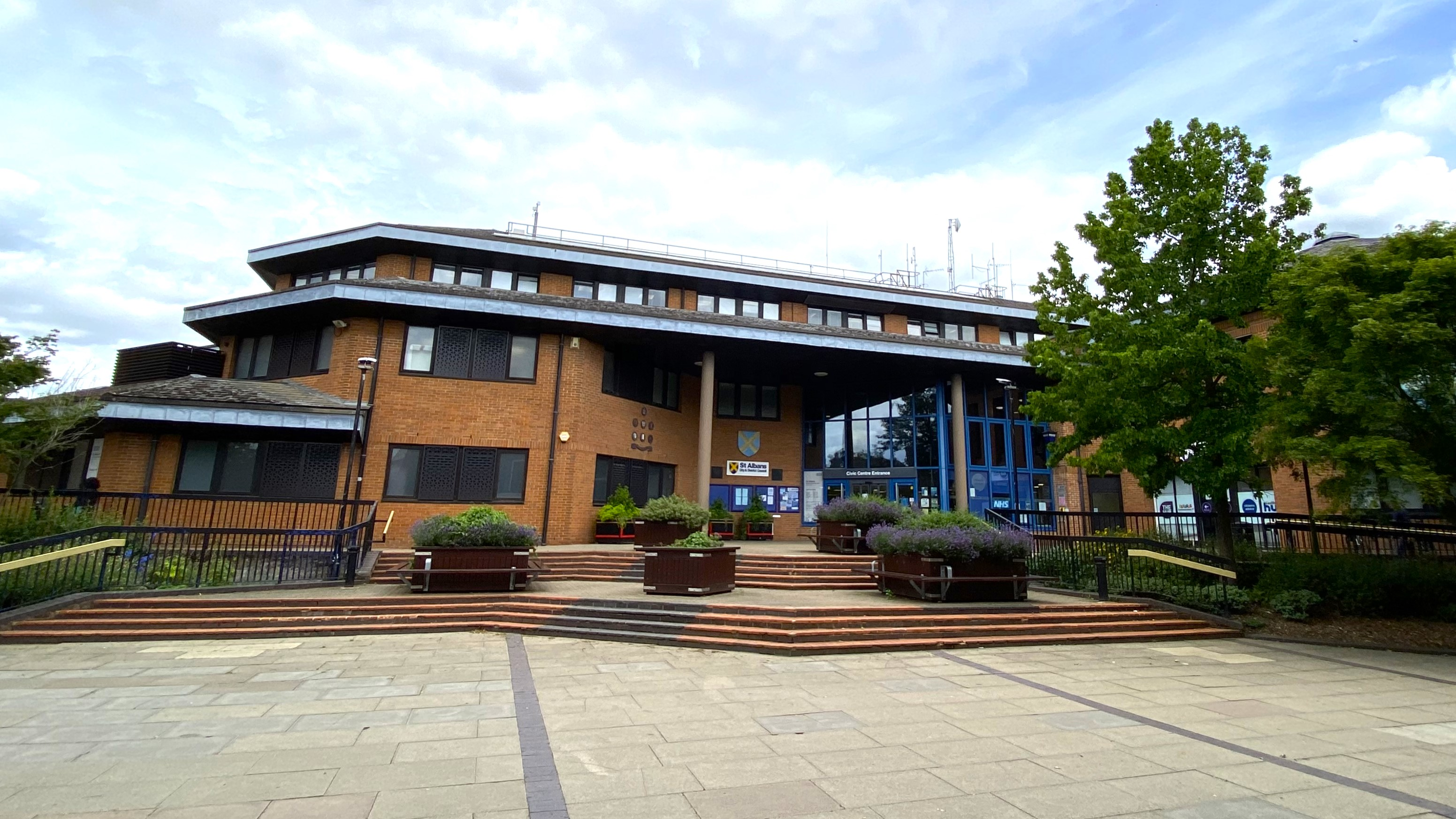
Black's and Ryan's target, the Civic Centre on St Peter's Street, St Albans

Black was killed, along with fellow Volunteer, Frank Ryan, just before 10 PM on Friday 15 November 1991 in St Albans, Hertfordshire. It is possible that the pair were posing as a married couple, lovers or even brother and sister. While it is unknown how long Black was with Ryan, a period of some months is possible. The purpose of the mission—probably Black's first— had been planning to bomb a British Army military band which had been playing in theatre on St Peter's Street when the improvised explosive device—comprising 7 pounds (3.2 kg) of Semtex—she was carrying detonated prematurely in the doorway of a disused Barclay's Bank. Their target was a British Army military band from the Blues and Royals, which was playing a charity concert to a theatre audience of around 350 people on St Peter's Street when the device exploded, scattering them across the area. They had apparently tried to enter the premises to plant the device but had been deterred by the tight security cordon. It was reported that, had the bomb detonated five minutes later, the area would have been crowded with people leaving the concert.

Her obituary in the Republican News stated that she had joined the IRA as an intelligence gatherer as well as being in "full-time operational involvement". At the funeral of Frank Ryan a Sinn Féin leader, Jim Gibney, made a "polished, in delivery smooth" graveside oration, and stated that "I know that the Ryan family won't mind if the tribute I pay here today is both to their son and Patricia Black, who died alongside him ... your children do not just belong to your family, they belong to our family, they belonged to the republican family".

The Black family began receiving hate mail after the bombing, and neighbours reported that when Black's personal possessions were returned to her mother, they were broken. Three days after Black's death, police and soldiers arrived at her mother's house in three Land Rovers and sang "It'll Be Lonely This Christmas".

=== Funeral and inquest ===
Black's grave in Milltown Cemetery, Belfast

Baggage handlers at Belfast International Airport refused to touch the coffin—as they had also done with the Gibraltar three—so Black was returned via a cortege from Dublin Airport. She was buried in Milltown Cemetery, Belfast, two weeks later. The funeral, at St Oliver Plunkett's Church, was held the day after she would have celebrated her 19th birthday. It was private, as her family had not known of her IRA membership; it was later reported that they had resisted pressure from the Republican Movement to allow a joint paramilitary funeral with Ryan, effectively disowning the IRA in public. Conversely, while Black received nine tributes in the month after she died, only one of them—to "our aunt 'Tricia"—did not emphasise her IRA connection.

Her burial took place some distance from the Republican plot, as her mother had requested no paramilitary trappings such as the guard of honour, a volley of shots, or republican flags as was usually the case for volunteers killed on active service. Friends carried orange, white and green flowers. Instead a colour party came out and fired several volleys of shots in Ballymurphy, at the Loughall Martyrs mural a few days previously. The local MP—and Sinn Féin president, Gerry Adams, was among those who carried the coffin to Milltown, along with Alex Maskey and other party members. Anti-British graffiti and black flags lined the route of the procession and soldiers staked out residents' front gardens, although security was otherwise unobtrusive.

The inquest—held in St Albans magistrates' court, close to where the army band had been playing—in February 1993 returned a verdict of accidental death. The pathologist, Richard Shepherd, reported that he only had a collection of body parts to work with due to the proximity of Black to the bomb. Shephard said "there was extensive disruption of their bodies ... both had died as a result of multiple injuries" . The coroner stated that no one else was apparently involved, and that "it is a reasonable to presume that they were there on some nefarious exercise".

== Legacy ==
The IRA claimed responsibility for the attack two days later. Black's injuries made it impossible to identify her by anything other than her dental records. Hers and Ryan's deaths led to an immediate spate of media panic warning of a Christmas IRA campaign in Britain, as, apart from Black's and Ryan's operation, there were several firebombings in London, with explosives being found in a lock-up garage. Police believed that an arms cache discovered in Selworthy Close, Wanstead, was connected to Black's cell. Scotland Yard detectives travelled to Northern Ireland to investigate; codenamed Operation Oregon, the search into their backgrounds was to be "one of the most intensive man-hunts in recent British history". However, no other members of her unit were ever identified.

The IRA named her in a statement, and although it denied the Blues and Royals band was the target, it acknowledged that she was on active service at the time of her death. She was only the second female provisional to die on foreign service. Media interest in the case was heightened by Black's youth. Black's death at such a young age drew commentators to suggest that "learned nothing from previous mistakes, and was running of bombers". Writing in The Guardian, Owen Bowcott suggested that she "remained [a] shadowy figure, portrayed as martyrs to the cause or pawns in a deadly game", and that she probably joined the IRA as a means of retaliating against perceived injustices . Kevin Toolis has commented that Black's "had not been a heroic death but a fatal fumble in a darkened doorway."

== Memorials ==
The Volunteers Patricia Black and Frankie Ryan Memorial Flute Band from the Garngad area of Glasgow is jointly named after her. A political mural depicting a uniformed armed female republican in uniform in the Lenadoon area of Belfast is jointly dedicated to Black as well as Laura Crawford, Bridie Quinn and Mairéad Farrell. Black's name was inscribed on the Lenadoon roll of honour mural beneath that of Mairéad Farrell. Black, along with Farrell, the Price Sisters, Bronwyn McGahan and Geraldine Ferrity is discussed in the context of Irish republican feminism and armed struggle. A memorial to Black and Ryan was erected in their honour at the Sally Gardens Centre in Belfast in 2007. A memorial ceremony on the 25th anniversary of Patricia Black's death faced criticism when images of children wearing "paramilitary regalia" were circulated in the media.
