= Hugh Feeney =

Irish IRA member (born 1951)

Hugh Feeney (born 1951) is a former volunteer in the Provisional Irish Republican Army (IRA) who, together with Dolours Price and Marian Price, organised the car bombings of the Old Bailey and Great Scotland Yard on 8 March 1973. He and ten members of his 11-man active service unit (ASU) were apprehended attempting to board a flight to Ireland shortly after the bombs were discovered.

== Arrest, conviction, and imprisonment ==
Feeney was convicted on 14 November 1973 and sentenced to life imprisonment for each of the four bombing charges against him, which were to run concurrently.

The other members of his group were sentenced to life imprisonment as well as an additional twenty years. Feeney and other members of the group were incarcerated in Brixton Prison, and participated in a 205-day hunger strike with the goal of being transferred closer to their homes in Northern Ireland. Feeney and the other hunger strikers were force-fed by prison authorities for 167 days of their strike.

In May 1974, Feeney was one of a group of four prisoners whose transfer out of Brixton was demanded anonymously in exchange for the return of $19.2 million in stolen art. On 4 June 1974, the IRA kidnapped John Hely-Hutchinson, 7th Earl of Donoughmore and his wife in an unsuccessful attempt to exchange them for the release of Feeney, the Prices, and Gerry Kelly. The prisoners ended their hunger strike on 7 June 1974. Feeney was transferred to Long Kesh prison soon after the hunger strike ended.

During this period he and Brendan Hughes wrote IRA communiqués and articles for Republican News under the pen name "Brownie", although most material published under this pseudonym was written by Gerry Adams. After Adams's release, Feeney began writing under the pseudonym "Salon".

== Release and Deportation ==
Feeney was released from custody in 1986. On 20 May 1991, he was arrested in New York City and deported the next day for having illegally entered the United States.

Feeney was arrested at the offices of The Irish People, an Irish republican newspaper published by Martin Galvin in New York City. The arrest was controversial because it involved an FBI agent posing as a journalism student in order to gain access to the paper's editorial offices, which was a violation of FBI policy at the time.
