= Ballinamore =

Town in County Leitrim, Ireland

Ballinamore Béal an Átha Móir
- Town
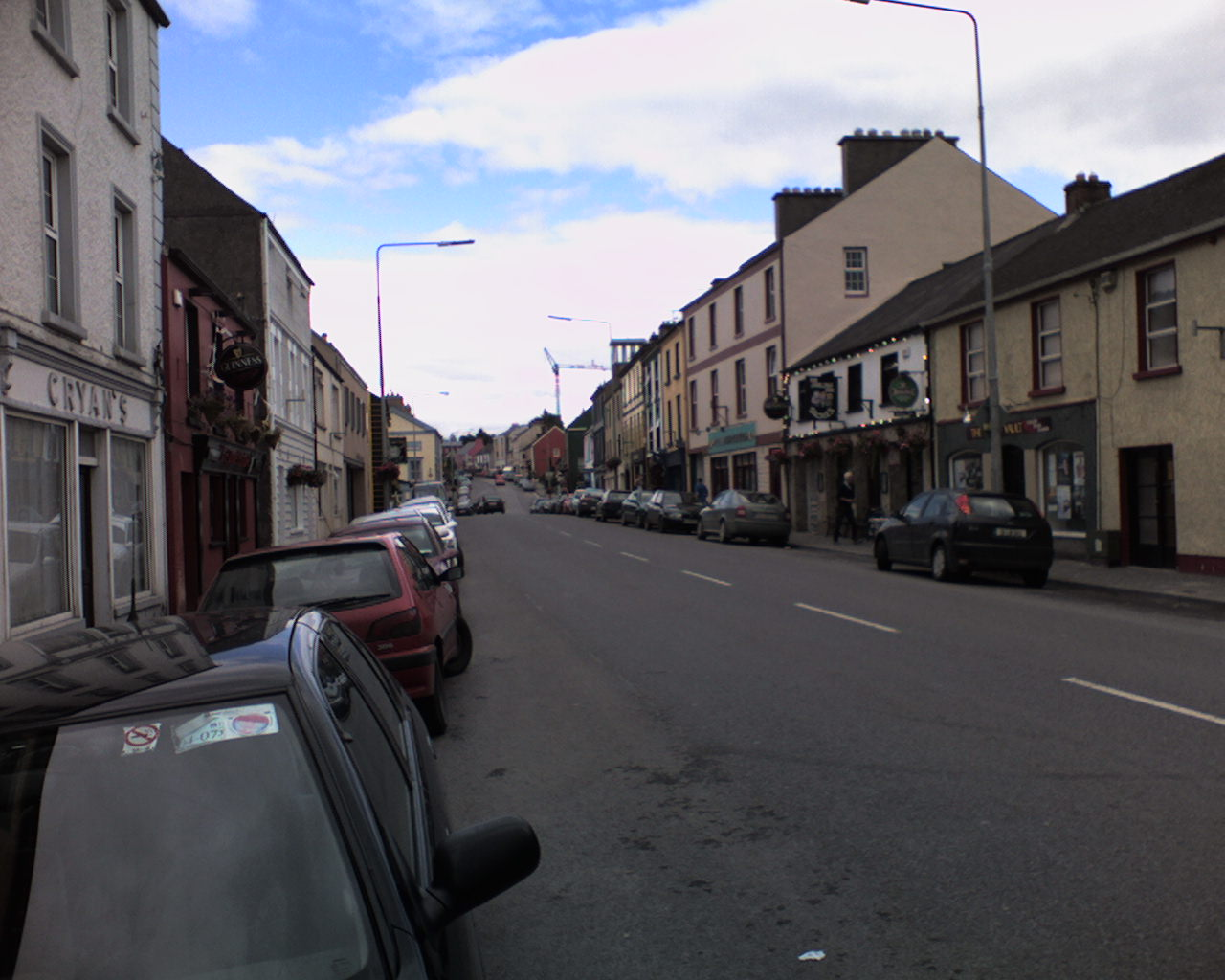
- Main Street-High Street, Ballinamore

- Location in Ireland
- Coordinates: 54.052°N 7.802°W
- Country: Ireland
- Province: Connacht
- County: County Leitrim
- Barony: Carrigallen

Area
  - Total: 1.206 km^{2} (0.466 sq mi)
- Elevation: 74 m (243 ft)

Population
  - Total: 1,112
  - Density: 922.2/km^{2} (2,388/sq mi)
  - Ethnicity (2022 census): Ethnic groups: 85.8% White; 74.6% White Irish; 10.9% White Other; 0.4% Irish Traveller; 1.7% Asian / Asian Irish; 7.2% Black / Black Irish; 2.8% Other / Mixed background; 2.4% Not stated
- Irish Grid Reference: H131112
- Website: www.ballinamore.ie

Ballinamore (Irish: Béal an Átha Móir, meaning "mouth of the big ford") is a small town in the south-east of County Leitrim in Ireland.

== Etymology ==
Béal an Átha Móir, corrupted Bellanamore, means "town at the mouth of the big ford", so named because it was a main crossing (ford) of the Yellow River. The gaels called the baile Átha na Chuirre ("homestead of ford of the afflictions") because a hospital-house stood near the bridge in the 13th century.

== Location ==
Ballinamore is in the south-east of County Leitrim in the North Midlands of Ireland, the town being 19 km (12 mi) from the county boundary with County Fermanagh. The town is built on the Yellow River. The R202 regional road intersects the R199 and R204 roads here. A historic barge waterway, built in the 1840s to connect the Erne and Shannon rivers, was reopened for boat traffic in 1994 as the Shannon–Erne Waterway. Ballinamore has daily Local-link bus services to Carrick-on-Shannon and Dromod railway station, Monday to Saturday.

== History ==
After the 5th century, the Conmaicne settled this area, displacing and absorbing an older tribe named the "Masraigh". These Conmhaicne ancestors were called the "Cenel Luacháin". This is the origins of Ballinamore.

In 1244, the town (Irish: baile) was named Áth na Chuirre ("ford of the afflictions") because, according to the Irish Annals, a hospital dedicated to Saint John the Baptist (Irish: spital) stood beside the ford. Saint Bridget's church, and holy-well, stood on a high hill one kilometre north of present-day town.

In 1256, the Battle of Magh Slecht occurred nearby, leading to the division of Bréifne between the O'Rourkes of North Leitrim and the O'Reillys of East Bréifne (modern-day County Cavan).

In 1621, the name 'Ballinamore' is first mentioned, when under the Plantation of Leitrim, the "Manor of Ballinamore" was granted to Sir Fenton Parsons with 600 acres (2.4 km^{2}) of arable land.

Around 1693, Ballinamore Iron works was established, and in production until circa 1747 when the business was put up for sale, the assets including a furnace, forge, slitting mill, mine yards, coal yards, large quantities of pig iron, mine and coals. (Note: Iron works at Ballinamore, Castlefore, and Dromod, were established on Irish land confiscated during the plantations of Ireland, by english adventurers named Capt. William Slacke, John Skerret, and Joseph Hall.) The native Irish forests bounding the parish were exhausted for this mining.

In the 18th century, dispossessed Catholics from County Down settled in the area.

In 1860, the Ballinamore and Ballyconnell Canal was opened, but declined in use after 24 October 1887, the date Ballinamore railway station opened. The railway station was part of the narrow gauge Cavan and Leitrim Railway and was the hub of the line, with the locomotive depot and works. It was the point where the line from Dromod through Mohill and Ballinamore to Belturbet branched to Kiltubrid, Drumshanbo and Arigna. The railway line was used until closure on 1 April 1959.

In the 19th, and early 20th centuries, annual fairs were held at Ballinamore on- 12 May, and 12 November.

In 1925, Ballinamore town comprised 163 houses, approximately 28 being licensed to sell alcohol.

In 1994, the Ballinamore and Ballyconnell Canal was reopened as the Shannon–Erne Waterway and marketed as a tourist/cruising waterway.

=== Annalistic references ===
Various Irish Annals mention the baile of Áth na Cuirre, i.e. Ballinamore, in 1244 AD. A Connachta army marched from nearby Fenagh towards the baile, presumably along the R202 route. At the Yellow River ford, today's bridge into the Main Street, the soldiers vandalised the nearby Hospital of Saint John the Baptist, accidentally killing one of their own, (Note: Or a sudden blast of wind according to the Annals of Clonmacnoise- "Phelym O’Connor with great forces … came to the Corre, where there was a tymber house of Couples, into which Magnus m’Mortagh, and Connor m’Cormack entered, & immediately there arose a great blase of winde, which fell down the house, whereof one couple fell on the said Magnus … was struken dead;") an important leader of Clann Murtagh O'Connor named Mhaghnusa mic Muircertaig Muimnigh.

Irish: "Do imdhigh in slúag iarsin ass an mbaile amach, ... co h-Ath na Cuirre forsan nGeircthigh, & do bhí an tuile tar bruachaib di, & ni rancotar tairrsi condernsat tech sbidél Eoin Baisde do bhái a nimeal in átha do scaoiled, da chur tarsan abhuinn do dhul tairsi dont slúaig; condechaid mac Muircertaig Muimnigh, .i. Maghnus, isin tech, & Concobar mac Cormaic Mic Diarmada; condubairt Maghnus risin bfer do bhí thúass ag scaoiled an tighe, ag sínshépe a cloidem uadha súas, agsin an tairrnge chongbhus an maide gan tuitim; leisin comrádh sin do thuit airrghe an tighe a gcend Mhaghnusa mic Muircertaig Muimnigh, gonderna brúligh día chinn, gur bhó marbh dhe ar an lathair sin"

"English: The host went afterwards out of the town, ... to Ath-na-cuirre on the Geirctech; and the flood was over its banks, and they did not pass over it until they pulled down the hospital-house of John the Baptist, which was on the margin of the ford, to place it across the river, that the host might pass over it. The son of Muirchertach Muimhnech, i.e. Maghnus, and Conchobhar, son of Cormac Mac Diarmada, went into the house, when Maghnus, pointing up his sword, said to the man who was overhead throwing down the house, ‘there is the nail which prevents the beam from falling.’ At these words the rafter of the house fell on the head of Maghnus, son of Muirchertach Muimhnech, and fractured his skull, so that he died on the spot;".

[text: Annals of Lough Ce https://celt.ucc.ie/published/T100010A/text010.html]

=== Don Tidey kidnapping ===
In 1983, members of the Provisional IRA kidnapped Quinnsworth managing director Don Tidey, holding him captive in Derrada Woods, outside of the town. Garda Gary Sheehan (police officer) and Private Patrick Kelly were murdered during a rescue attempt. Historians believe local Sinn Féin politician John Joe McGirl assisted the kidnappers in holding Tidey at the location.

== Notable features ==
The local Church of Ireland church is the oldest building in Ballinamore in the 1780s from the ruins of the local Roman Catholic Church (St Patrick's) demolished during the reformation and penal laws.

The nearby Ballinamore Estate was granted to the Ormsby family in 1677. Elizabethan settlers located at first in County Sligo, from where they spread into Counties Mayo, Roscommon and Galway. The Ballinamore branch were descended from the Ormsby of Comyn or Cummin in County Sligo.

There is a monument to the IRA Chief of Staff, TD, and local councillor John Joe McGirl on an island on the Shannon-Erne Waterway.

== Sport ==
Ballinamore Seán O'Heslin's GAA are the local Gaelic games club.

== Popular culture ==
Christy Moore released a song called The Ballad of Ballinamore in 1984, giving the writing credits to Fintan Vallely. Later compilations have referred to the song as simply Ballinamore. The song was a parody of an earlier Irish rebel song called The Man from the Daily Mail. It was written after an RTÉ investigation in the Ballinamore area for evidence of the abducted racehorse Shergar (believed to be abducted by the Provisional IRA) found several locals refusing to say anything other than "no comment".

== See also ==
- List of towns and villages in Ireland
- Cenel Lucháin

== Notes and references ==
=== Secondary sources ===
- Ó Duígeannáin, Mícheál (1934). "Notes on the History of the Kingdom of Bréifne". The Journal of the Royal Society of Antiquaries of Ireland. 64–65 (1) (Digitized 2008 from the original at the University of California ed.). Royal Society of Antiquaries of Ireland: 113–140. JSTOR 25513764.
- Meehan, Joseph B. (1926). "Cavan and Leitrim Items in 18th Century Periodicals. I." (PDF). The Breifny Antiquarian Society's Journal. II (III). Archived from the original (PDF) on 1 March 2017.
- Longman (1819). Traveller's New Guide Through Ireland, Containing a New and Accurate Description of the Roads (digitized from original in Lyon Public Library [2011] ed.). Longman. Archived from the original on 15 July 2020.
- Watsons (1830). The Gentleman's and citizen's almanack ... for the year (PDF). Dublin, Printed for S. Watson [etc.]
- Irish Free State (1925). Intoxicating Liquor Commission Report (Report). Vol. Reports of Committees. The Stationery Office. Archived from the original on 15 December 2018.
- Kelly, Liam (1995). The Face of Time. Lilliput Press.
- Seymour, John D (1935). "Drumreilly and Its Clergy A.D. 1401-1481". The Journal of the Royal Society of Antiquaries of Ireland. Seventh Series. 5 No. 2 (31 December 1935) (2): 245–253. JSTOR 25513789.
- Earley, Joseph E; O'Seaneachain, Diarmuid (2015). The medieval island church in Lough Garadice. Vol. BREIFNE JOURNAL OF CUMANN SEANCHAIS BHREIFNE. pp. 439–469. Archived from the original on 26 August 2019.
- Bambury, Pádraig (2008). "Annála Connacht" (Electronic edition compiled by the CELT Team (2001)(2008) ed.). CELT: Corpus of Electronic Texts: a project of University College Cork College Road, Cork, Ireland—http://www.ucc.ie/celt. p. 1244.57. Archived from the original on 3 March 2016.
- Hennessy, William M. (2008). "Annals of Lough Ce" (Electronic edition compiled by the CELT Team (2002)(2008) ed.). CELT: Corpus of Electronic Texts: a project of University College Cork College Road, Cork, Ireland—http://www.ucc.ie/celt. pp. LC1244.4. Archived from the original on 25 March 2017.
- O'Donovan, John, ed. (1856). Annála Rioghachta Éireann. Annals of the Kingdom of Ireland by the Four Masters ... with a Translation and Copious Notes. 7 vols. Translated by O'Donovan (2nd ed.). Dublin: Royal Irish Academy. CELT editions. Full scans at Internet Archive: Vol. 1; Vol. 2; Vol. 3; Vol. 4; Vol. 5; Vol. 6; Indices.
- Simms, Katharine (2001). "A Lost Tribe: The Clan Murtagh O'Conors". Journal of the Galway Archaeological and Historical Society. 53. Galway Archaeological & Historical Society: 1–22. JSTOR 25535718.
