= Gerry Kelly =

Irish politician and former IRA volunteer (born 1953)

Gerry Kelly MLA
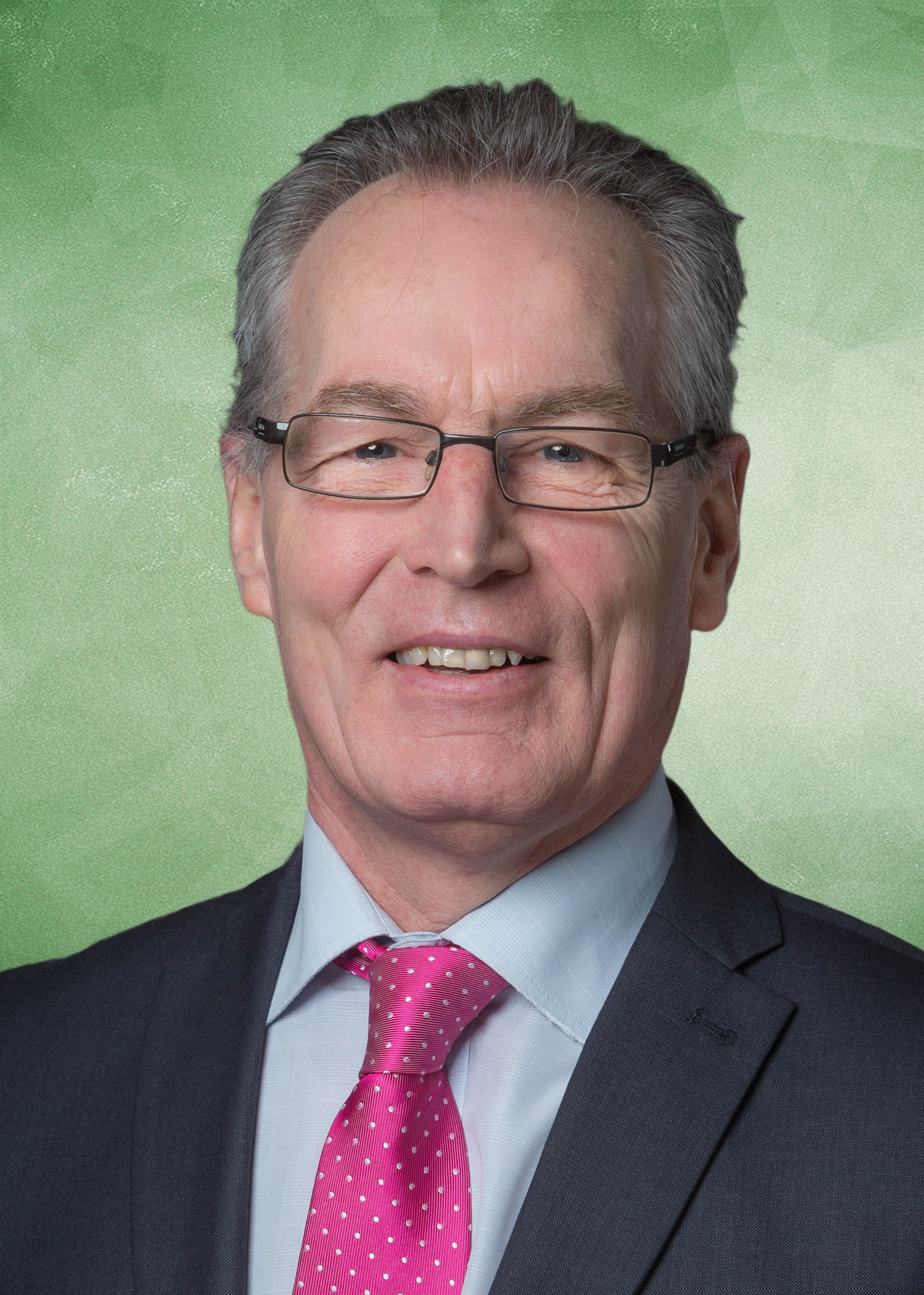
- Kelly in January 2015

Junior Minister Assisting the Deputy First Minister
- In office 8 May 2007 – 16 May 2011
- Deputy FM: Martin McGuinness
- Preceded by: Denis Haughey
- Succeeded by: Martina Anderson

Member of the Legislative Assembly for Belfast North
- Incumbent
- Assumed office 25 June 1998
- Preceded by: Office created

Northern Ireland Forum Member for Belfast North
- In office 30 May 1996 – 25 April 1998

Personal details
- Born: Gerard Francis Kelly; 5 April 1953 (age 73) Lower Falls, Belfast, Northern Ireland
- Party: Sinn Féin (since 1989)
- Spouse: Margaret McElkerney
- Children: 7
- Education: St Peter's Secondary School, Britton's Parade, Belfast
- Portfolio: Policing
- Website: North Belfast - Gerry Kelly

Military service
- Paramilitary: Fianna Éireann (1971–1972) Provisional IRA (1972–1990s)
- Rank: Volunteer
- Unit: Belfast Brigade
- Battles/wars: The Troubles: 1973 Old Bailey bombing; Maze Prison escape

Gerard Francis Kelly (Irish: Gearárd Ó Ceallaigh; born 5 April 1953) is an Irish republican politician and former Provisional Irish Republican Army (IRA) volunteer who played a leading role in the negotiations that led to the Good Friday Agreement on 10 April 1998. He is currently a member of Sinn Féin's Ard Chomhairle (National Executive) and a Member of the Northern Ireland Assembly (MLA) for North Belfast.

== Early life ==
Gerard Francis Kelly was born on 5 April 1953 on Raglan Street in the Lower Falls area of Belfast. He is one of eleven children, seven boys and four girls. He went to St Finian's Primary School on the Falls Road. His family was not particularly political; however his grandfather was a supporter of the Labour Party. Kelly later went to St Peter's Secondary School, obtaining his O-Levels, before receiving his first job, aged 17, in the Civil Service as a clerical officer with the Belfast Corporation Electricity Department.

In 1971, Kelly joined the militant republican youth organisation, Fianna Éireann. He was later arrested in August 1971 and imprisoned in Mountjoy prison for several months. In January 1972 he escaped, and joined the Provisional IRA in the Whiterock/Ballymurphy area on his return to Belfast.

== Old Bailey attack ==
The IRA planted four car bombs in London on 8 March 1973. Two of the car bombs were defused: a fertilizer bomb in a car outside the Post Office in Broadway and the BBC's armed forces radio studio in Dean Stanley Street. However, the other two exploded, one near the Old Bailey and the other at Ministry of Agriculture off Whitehall. As a result of the explosions one person died and almost 200 people were injured.

Kelly, then aged 19, and eight others, including Hugh Feeney and sisters Marian and Dolours Price, were found guilty of various charges relating to the bombings on 14 November 1973. Kelly was convicted of causing explosions and conspiracy to cause explosions, and received two life sentences plus twenty years.

== Imprisonment and hunger strike ==
Upon imprisonment in Britain, Kelly, and the other prisoners went on hunger strike demanding political prisoner status and to be transferred to prisons in Northern Ireland. After 60 days on hunger strike, during which he was force-fed by prison officers, Kelly was transferred to HMP Maze prison in Northern Ireland in April 1975.

While imprisoned in the Maze, Kelly again went on protest and made a number of escape attempts in 1977, 1982 and 1983. On 25 September 1983, Kelly was involved in the Maze Prison escape, the largest break-out of prisoners in Europe since World War II and in UK prison history. Kelly, along with 37 other republican prisoners, armed with six handguns, hijacked a prison meals lorry and smashed their way out of the Maze past 40 prison officers and 28 alarm systems. During the escape Kelly shot a prison officer, who attempted to foil the escape, in the head with a gun that had been smuggled into the jail. The officer survived.

After the mass break-out Kelly was on the run for three years and again became involved in IRA activity in Europe. Whilst on the run Kelly claimed he was aided in his escape by "all kinds of people", including prominent Fianna Fáil and Fine Gael supporters in the Republic of Ireland.

On 16 January 1986, Kelly was arrested in the Netherlands along with Brendan "Bik" McFarlane at their flat in Amsterdam. At the time of their arrest, cash in several currencies, maps and fake passports and the keys to a storage container holding 14 rifles, 100,000 rounds of ammunition and nitrobenzene were recovered by the Dutch police.

On 4 December 1986, the pair were extradited from the Netherlands to the United Kingdom by RAF helicopter and were returned to the Maze prison. On 2 June 1989, Kelly was released in line with the extradition conditions agreed with the Dutch authorities.

== Political career ==
Upon leaving prison, Kelly became actively involved in politics, becoming a leading member of Sinn Féin. Kelly and fellow Sinn Féin member Martin McGuinness both engaged in protracted secret negotiations with representatives of the British Government from 1990 until 1993. Kelly also published a collection of poetry, Words from a Cell, in 1989. Kelly played a role in the Northern Ireland peace process negotiations that led to the Good Friday Agreement on 10 April 1998. In promoting the peace process he had talks with Nelson Mandela, Thabo Mbeki, Bill Clinton, Tony Blair and Bertie Ahern.

On 27 June 1998, he was elected to the Northern Ireland Assembly. He was Deputy Chair of the Social Development Committee in the 1998-2003 Assembly, and is currently Sinn Féin Spokesperson for Policing and Justice, and a political member of the Northern Ireland Policing Board.

In 2013, aged 60, Kelly was criticised by other MLAs (Members of the Legislative Assembly) in Northern Ireland, for holding on to the front of a Police Service of Northern Ireland vehicle, as it drove away with him during a protest in his constituency.

Kelly was a Sinn Féin representative during the talks chaired by Richard Haass in 2013 on contentious issues in Northern Ireland.

Kelly brought libel proceedings against a journalist who had talked in two 2019 radio interviews about the 1983 prison officer shooting. His case was dismissed by the Belfast High Court in January 2024 as "scandalous, frivolous and vexatious".

== Personal life ==
Kelly is married to Margaret McElkerney. Between them they have seven children and four grandchildren. They live on the Falls Road in west Belfast.

== Cultural references ==
In the 2017 film Maze dramatising the 1983 prison break, directed by Stephen Burke, Kelly was portrayed by Irish actor Patrick Buchanan.

Northern Ireland Forum
New forum	Member for North Belfast; 1996–1998	Forum dissolved
Northern Ireland Assembly
New assembly Good Friday Agreement	MLA for Belfast North; 1998–present	Incumbent
Political offices
Preceded by Denis Haughey	Junior Minister, Office of the First Minister and deputy First Minister; 2007–2011	Succeeded by Martina Anderson
