= Argyll and Bute Council elections =

Local government elections in Argyll and Bute, Scotland

Argyll and Bute Council in Scotland holds elections every five years, previously holding them every four years from its creation as a single-tier authority in 1995 to 2007.

== Council elections ==
=== As a district council ===
Year	SNP	Conservative	Labour	Liberal (Note: SDP–Liberal Alliance from 1981 to 1988, Liberal Democrats from 1988.)	Independent
1974	0	5	0	0	21
1977	2	4	0	0	20
1980	3	2	1	0	20
1984 (Note: New ward boundaries.)	1	3	0	0	22
1988	3	3	1	3	16
1992	2	4	1	3	16

=== As a unitary authority ===
Year	SNP	Conservative	Labour	Liberal Democrats	Green	Independent
1995	4	3	2	3	0	21
1999 (Note: New ward boundaries.)	5	4	1	6	0	20
2003	3	3	0	8	0	22
2007 (Note: Change to single transferable vote system and new ward boundaries.)	10	3	0	7	0	16
2012	13	4	0	4	0	15
2017 (Note: New ward boundaries.)	11	9	0	6	0	10
2022	12	10	1	5	1	7

== Results maps ==
1995 results map

1999 results map

2003 results map

2017 results map

2022 results map

== By-elections ==
=== 2007-2012 ===
Helensburgh and Lomond South By-Election 4 October 2007
Party	Candidate	FPv%	Count			
Party	Candidate	FPv%	1	2	3	4
Liberal Democrats	Andrew Nisbit	30.3	642	752	1,014	1,525
Conservative	Jim Proctor	29.6	627	684	839	
Independent	Gordon Hanning	23.3	493	606		
SNP	Richard Trail	16.8	356			
Liberal Democrats gain from Independent						
Valid: 2,118 Spoilt: 10 Quota: 1,060 Turnout: 2,128

Oban North and Lorn by-election 3 November 2011
Party	Candidate	FPv%	Count			
Party	Candidate	FPv%	1	2	3	4
SNP	Louise Glen-Lee	44.1	1,081	1,117	1,179	1,374
Conservative	Roy Rutherford	20.6	505	523	591	758
Independent	Gwyneth Neal	17.9	438	496	561	
Liberal Democrats	David Pollard	10.6	260	273		
Independent	George Doyle	6.7	165			
SNP hold						
Valid: 2,449 Spoilt: 19 Quota: 1,225 Turnout: 2,468

=== 2012-2017 ===
Oban South and the Isles By-Election 23 May 2014
Party	Candidate	FPv%	Count				
Party	Candidate	FPv%	1	2	3	4	5
Labour	Neil MacIntyre	26.3	918	946	1,134	1,413	2,001
SNP	Iain MacLean	28.1	980	988	1,102	1,260	
Liberal Democrats	David Pollard	18.2	635	742	865		
Independent	John MacGregor	17.6	616	688			
Conservative	Andrew Vennard	9.9	345				
Labour gain from Independent							
Valid: 3,494 Spoilt: 31 Quota: 1,748 Turnout: 3,525

Oban North and Lorn By-Election 17 July 2014
Party	Candidate	FPv%	Count				
Party	Candidate	FPv%	1	2	3	4	5
Independent	John MacGregor	22.7	548	614	771	920	1,293
SNP	Gerry Fisher	24.6	595	635	658		
Labour	Kieron Green	21.8	526	572	681	874	
Conservative	Andrew Vennard	18.4	445	493			
Independent	Marri Molloy	12.5	301				
Independent gain from SNP							
Electorate: 7,821 Valid: 2,415 Spoilt: 28 Quota: 1,208 Turnout: 2,443 (30.88%)

Oban North and Lorn By-Election 23 October 2014
Party	Candidate	FPv%	Count			
Party	Candidate	FPv%	1	2	3	4
SNP	Iain MacLean	40.9	1,090	1,102	1,199	1,635
Independent	Stephanie Irvine	23.6	629	812	1,080	
Labour	Kieron Green	19.9	530	621		
Conservative	Andrew Vennard	15.6	415			
SNP gain from Independent						
Valid: 2,664 Spoilt: 25 Quota: 1,333 Turnout: 2,689

South Kintyre By-Election 11 December 2014
Party	Candidate	FPv%	Count
Party	Candidate	FPv%	1
SNP	John Armour	62.2	942
Liberal Democrats	Joyce Oxborrow	14.1	214
Conservative	Charlotte Hanbury	13.4	203
Labour	Michael Kelly	10.3	156
SNP hold			
Valid: 1,515 Spoilt: 7 Quota: 759 Turnout: 1,522

Oban North and Lorn By-Election 18 February 2016
Party	Candidate	FPv%	Count			
Party	Candidate	FPv%	1	2	3	4
SNP	Julie McKenzie	42.3	1,113	1,186	1,241	1,656
Conservative	Andrew Vennard	23.2	609	640		
Independent	Kieron Green	23.1	608	721	1,048	
Green	Pat Tyrell	11.4	300			
SNP gain from Independent						
Valid: 2,630 Spoilt: 9 Quota: 1,316 Turnout: 2,639

Oban North and Lorn By-Election 2 June 2016
Party	Candidate	FPv%	Count			
Party	Candidate	FPv%	1	2	3	4
Independent	Kieron Green	26.8	711	821	1,160	1,617
SNP	Breege Smyth	39.8	1,055	1,097	1,138	
Conservative	Andrew Ross Vennard	22.3	591	668		
Liberal Democrats	David Pollard	11.1	294			
Valid: 2,651 Spoilt: 16 Quota: 1,326 Turnout: 2,667

=== 2017-2022 ===
Helensburgh and Lomond South By-Election 18 March 2021
Party	Candidate	FPv%	Count
Party	Candidate	FPv%	1
Conservative	Gemma Penfold	50.7	1,206
SNP	Math Campbell-Sturgess	23.6	562
Liberal Democrats	Henry Boswell	14.0	333
Labour	Jane Kelly	5.6	133
Green	Mike Crowe	5.2	123
Workers Party	Paul Burrows	0.9	22
Conservative gain from Liberal Democrats			
Valid: 2,379 Spoilt: 15 Quota: 1,190 Turnout: 2,394

Isle of Bute By-Election 18 March 2021
Party	Candidate	FPv%	Count				
Party	Candidate	FPv%	1	2	3	4	5
Independent	Liz McCabe	20.4	411	475	564	772	1,034
SNP	Kim Findlay	32.7	658	688	701	767	
Independent	Fraser Gillies	19.0	382	419	539		
Conservative	Peter Wallace	16.8	338	367			
Labour	Dawn MacDonald	11.1	224				
Independent hold							
Valid: 2,013 Spoilt: 27 Quota: 1,007 Turnout: 2,040

Lomond North By-Election 16 December 2021
Party	Candidate	FPv%	Count			
Party	Candidate	FPv%	1	2	3	4
Conservative	Paul Collins	40.7	742	786	805	1,100
Independent	Mark Irvine	22.9	418	494	711	
SNP	Ken Smith	25.2	459	489		
Independent	Robert MacIntyre	11.2	204			
Conservative hold						
Valid: 1,823 Spoilt: 19 Quota: 912 Turnout: 1,842

=== 2022-2027 ===
Kintyre and the Islands By-Election 29 September 2022
Party	Candidate	FPv%	Count					
Party	Candidate	FPv%	1	2	3	4	5	6
Independent	Alastair Redman	32.7	591	597	618	701	826	1,029
SNP	Lachie Macquarie	29.0	525	536	623	626	694	
Liberal Democrats	Kenny MacKenzie	14.6	265	283	313	375		
Conservative	Hamish Stewart	10.7	194	200	207			
Green	Tom Skinner	9.7	176	179				
Labour	Gopi Ageer	0.3	55					
Independent hold								
Valid: 1,806 Spoilt: 25 Quota: 904 Turnout: 1,831

South Kintyre By-Election 2 November 2023
Party	Candidate	FPv%	Count
Party	Candidate	FPv%	1
Independent	Jennifer Kelly	57.3	913
SNP	John Richardson	17.0	271
Conservative	Joe Cunningham	13.0	208
Liberal Democrats	Kenny MacKenzie	11.4	183
Freedom Alliance (UK)	Alan McManus	0.4	7
Independent hold			
Valid: 1,582 Spoilt: 10 Quota: 792 Turnout: 1,592

Kintyre and the Islands By-Election 18 July 2024
Party	Candidate	FPv%	Count				
Party	Candidate	FPv%	1	2	3	4	5
SNP	Anne Horn	43.4	728	731	793	832	1,013
Independent	Donald Kelly	19.2	322	327	397	531	
Conservative	Elizabeth Redman	19.2	322	326	369		
Liberal Democrats	Douglas MacDonald	16.7	281	286			
Freedom Alliance (UK)	Alan McManus	1.5	25				
SNP gain from Liberal Democrats							
Valid: 1,678 Spoilt: 17 Quota: 840 Turnout: 1,695

Mid Argyll By-Election 29 October 2026
Party	Candidate	FPv%	Count				
Party	Candidate	FPv%	1	2	3	4	5
SNP	Andy Buntin	46.1	820	822	867	872	893
Liberal Democrats	Douglas Macdonald	17.4	310	326	342	351	371
Conservative	Colvin Osborn	12.9	230	237	244	256	333
Reform	Kaine McConnell	8.5	151	154	159	217	
Restore	George Love	7.0	124	128	131		
ISP	Fiona Nelson	5.3	95	104			
Independent	David Moncrieff	2.8	50				
SNP gain from Independent							
Valid: 1,780 Spoilt: 18 Quota: 891 Turnout: 1,798
