= Argyll, Bute and South Lochaber =

UK Parliament constituency (since 2024)

- County constituency for the House of Commons
- Boundary of Argyll, Bute and South Lochaber in Scotland
- Subdivisions of Scotland: Argyll and Bute and Highland
- Electorate: 71,707 (March 2020)

Current constituency
- Created: 2024
- Member of Parliament: Brendan O'Hara (SNP)
- Seats: One
- Created from: Argyll and Bute (majority) & Ross, Skye and Lochaber (minority)

Argyll, Bute and South Lochaber is a constituency of the House of Commons in the UK Parliament. Further to the completion of the 2023 review of Westminster constituencies, it was first contested at the 2024 general election, since when it has been held by Brendan O'Hara of the Scottish National Party, who had been MP for the predecessor seat of Argyll and Bute from 2015 to 2024.

== Boundaries ==
The vast majority of the new constituency comprises the area of the abolished constituency of Argyll and Bute, which was coterminous with Argyll and Bute Council, and comprises the following wards:

- Cowal
- Dunoon
- Helensburgh Central
- Helensburgh and Lomond South
- Kintyre and the Islands
- Isle of Bute
- Lomond North
- Mid Argyll
- Oban South and the Isles
- Oban North and Lorn
- South Kintyre

In order to meet the electorate size requirements, the following area of the Highland Council has been added from the abolished constituency of Ross, Skye and Lochaber:

- The south and west of the Fort William and Ardnamurchan ward.

== Members of Parliament ==
| Election | Member | Party |
|---|---|---|
| 2024 | Brendan O'Hara | SNP |

== Elections ==
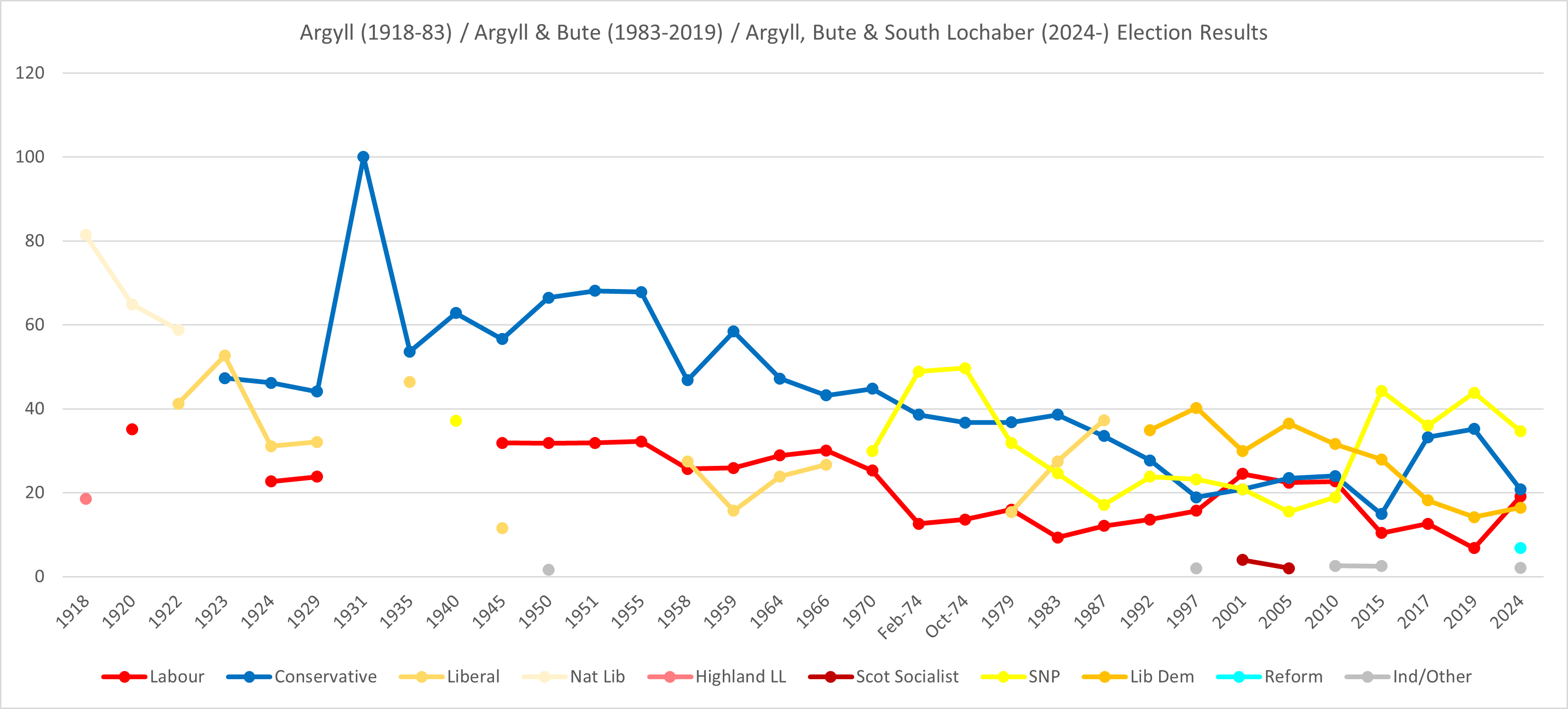
Argyll (1918–1983) / Argyll & Bute (1983–2019) / Argyll, Bute & South Lochaber (2024–) Election Results

=== Elections in the 2020s ===
General election 2024: Argyll, Bute and South Lochaber
| Party | Candidate | Votes | % | ±% |
|---|---|---|---|---|
| SNP | Brendan O'Hara | 15,582 | 34.7 | −9.5 |
| Conservative | Amanda Hampsey | 9,350 | 20.8 | −13.7 |
| Labour | Hamish Maxwell | 8,585 | 19.1 | +12.0 |
| Liberal Democrats | Alan Reid | 7,359 | 16.4 | +2.3 |
| Reform UK | Melanie Hurst | 3,045 | 6.8 | +6.7 |
| Independent | Tommy Macpherson | 941 | 2.1 | N/A |
| Majority | | 6,232 | 13.9 | +4.2 |
| Turnout | | 44,862 | 62.5 | −8.2 |
| SNP hold | | Swing | −4.2 | |

=== Elections in the 2010s ===
2019 notional result (Note: Estimate of the 2019 general election result as if the revised boundaries recommended under the 2023 boundary review were in place)
| Party | Vote | % |
|---|---|---|
| SNP | 22,403 | 44.2 |
| Conservative | 17,506 | 34.5 |
| Liberal Democrats | 7,172 | 14.1 |
| Labour | 3,592 | 7.1 |
| Brexit Party | 54 | 0.1 |
| Majority | 4,897 | 9.7 |
| Turnout | 50,727 | 70.7 |
| Electorate | 71,707 | |
