= Sir Jamie McGrigor, 6th Baronet =

Scottish politician (1949–2025)

Sir Jamie McGrigor Bt
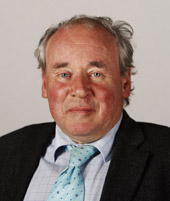
- Official portrait, 2011

Member of Argyll and Bute Council
- In office 4 May 2017 – 5 May 2022
- Preceded by: Alistair MacDougall
- Succeeded by: Amanda Hampsey
- Constituency: Oban South and the Isles

Member of the Scottish Parliament for Highlands and Islands (1 of 7 Regional MSPs)
- In office 6 May 1999 – 24 March 2016

Personal details
- Born: James Angus Rhoderick McGrigor; 19 October 1949 London, England
- Died: 20 July 2025 (aged 75)
- Party: Independent (2022–2025); Scottish Conservative (until 2022)
- Children: 6
- Education: University of Neuchâtel

Sir James Angus Rhoderick Neil McGrigor, 6th Baronet (19 October 1949 – 20 July 2025) was a Scottish Conservative Party politician, who was an Argyll and Bute Councillor for the Oban South and the Isles Ward from 2017 to 2022. He had previously served as a Member of the Scottish Parliament (MSP) for the Highlands and Islands region from 1999 until 2016.

== Early life and career ==
McGrigor was born in London in 1949 and educated at Cladich Primary School in Argyll and privately at Eton College. He studied Commercial French at the University of Neuchâtel in Switzerland. After graduating, he worked in finance in the City of London and in the shipping sector in Glasgow. He also farmed sheep and cattle, and started a trout farm in Argyll in the early 1970s.

== Political career ==
As a member of the Conservative Party, McGrigor stood unsuccessfully for the Western Isles in the 1997 general election. He fought Argyll and Bute in 2005, finishing second, and fought the equivalent seat in the 2007 Scottish Parliament election, finishing third.

McGrigor was elected in the 1999 Scottish Parliament election for the Highlands and Islands region. He served as Scottish Conservative spokesperson for fisheries, and communities and sport. Additionally, he was the Honorary Vice-President of the English-Speaking Union Scotland.

McGrigor was also the driving force behind the establishment of the Scottish Register of Tartans. His Member's Bill was given support by the Scottish Government and was subsequently passed by the Scottish Parliament on 9 October 2008. This makes McGrigor one of the first MSPs to have passed a Private Member's Bill through the Scottish Parliament. On 20 August 2015, he announced he would stand down at the 2016 Scottish Parliament election.

In 2017, he stood in the Argyll and Bute Council election and was elected to the Oban South and the Isles ward. McGrigor was deselected by the Conservative Party for the 2022 Council election. He was expelled from the party afterwards and stood for reelection as an independent. He placed ninth with 179 first preference votes and lost the election in the 4th round of counting.

== Personal life and death ==
McGrigor was the eldest son of the late Sir Charles McGrigor, 5th Bt, by his wife Mary Bettine (the historian Mary McGrigor), daughter of Sir Charles Edmonstone, 6th Baronet. He was descended patrilineally from Sir James McGrigor, 1st Baronet, Wellington's Surgeon General serving the British Army in Spain during the Peninsular campaign, who received a baronetcy in 1831. Another distinguished relative was the late Admiral of the Fleet Sir Rhoderick McGrigor, grandson of the second Baronet and thus his first cousin twice removed.

Jamie became the 6th Baronet upon the death of his father, Sir Charles, on 1 October 2007.

He was twice married and had six children. His son Alexander James Edward Lyon (born 1998), by his second marriage, succeeded him as the 7th Baronet.

McGrigor died from emphysema on 20 July 2025, at the age of 75.

Ancestors of Sir Jamie McGrigor, 6th Baronet

16. Sir Charles McGrigor, 2nd Baronet
8. Sir James McGrigor, 3rd Baronet
17. Elizabeth Anne Nickle
4. Sir Charles McGrigor, 4th Baronet
18. John Gilbert Meiggs
9. Helen Cornell Meiggs
19. Mary Augusta Faulkner
2. Sir Charles McGrigor, 5th Baronet
20. Walter Carew Cocks
10. Edward Lygon Somers Cocks
21. Hon. Isabella Alderson
5. Amabel Caroline Somers Cocks
22. Sir Charles Watson-Copley, 3rd Baronet
11. Amabel Jemima Watson-Copley
23. Georgina Tredcroft
1. Sir James McGrigor, 6th Baronet
24. Sir William Edmonstone, 4th Baronet
12. Sir Archibald Edmonstone, 5th Baronet
25. Mary Elizabeth Parsons
6. Sir Charles Edmonstone, 6th Baronet
26. George Stewart Forbes
13. Ida Agnes Eleanor Forbes
27. Henrietta Maria Ward
3. Mary Bettine Edmonstone
28. Marshall Field
14. Marshall Field Jr.
29. Nannie Douglas Scott
7. Gwendolyn Mary Field
30. Louis Charles Huck
15. Albertine Huck
31. Clara Kenkel

== Bibliography ==
- Leigh Rayment's list of baronets

Baronetage of the United Kingdom
Preceded by Charles Edward McGrigor	Baronet (of Campden Hill in the County of Middlesex); 2007–2025	Succeeded by Alexander James Edward Lyon McGrigor
