= Cowal (ward) =

Location of the ward

Cowal is one of the eleven wards used to elect members of the Argyll and Bute Council. It elects three Councillors.

== Councillors ==
| Election | Councillors | | |
|---|---|---|---|
| 2007 | Bruce Marshall (Ind.) | Alex McNaughton (Ind.) | Ron Simon (SNP) |
| 2012 | Bruce Marshall (Ind.) | Alex McNaughton (Ind.) | William Gordon Blair (SNP) |
| 2017 | Yvonne McNeilly (Conservative) | Alan Reid (Liberal Democrats) | William Gordon Blair (SNP) |
| 2022 | Yvonne McNeilly (Conservative) | William Sinclair (Liberal Democrats) | William Gordon Blair (SNP) |

== Election results ==
=== 2022 election ===
Cowal − 3 seats
| Party | Candidate | FPv% | Count | | | | | |
| Party | Candidate | FPv% | 1 | 2 | 3 | 4 | 5 | 6 |
|---|---|---|---|---|---|---|---|---|
| SNP | Gordon Blair (incumbent) | 33.3 | 1,090 | | | | | |
| Conservative | Yvonne McNeilly (incumbent) | 26.1 | 855 | | | | | |
| Liberal Democrats | William Sinclair | 16.8 | 551 | 563 | 577 | 587 | 669 | 857 |
| SNP | Lachie MacQuarie | 8.6 | 282 | 503 | 503 | 532 | 566 | 596 |
| Labour | Mark Feinmann | 7.7 | 251 | 262 | 267 | 273 | 303 | |
| Independent | Kenneth White | 5.2 | 170 | 174 | 179 | 201 | | |
| ISP | Fiona Nelson | 2.4 | 78 | 83 | 85 | | | |
Electorate: 5,991 Valid: 3,277 Spoilt: 64 Quota: 820 Turnout: 55.8%

=== 2017 election ===
2017 Argyll and Bute Council election

Cowal - 3 seats
| Party | Candidate | FPv% | Count | | | |
| Party | Candidate | FPv% | 1 | 2 | 3 | 4 |
|---|---|---|---|---|---|---|
| SNP | William Gordon Blair (incumbent) | 26.3 | 918 | | | |
| Conservative | Yvonne McNeilly | 26.2 | 912 | | | |
| Liberal Democrats | Alan Reid | 22.7 | 791 | 794.5 | 810.7 | 899.1 |
| Independent | Alex McNaughton (incumbent) | 11.2 | 389 | 391.6 | 400.7 | 428.5 |
| SNP | Alison Mulholland | 8.2 | 287 | 323.0 | 323.4 | 344.8 |
| Labour | Susanna Rice | 5.4 | 187 | 188.2 | 191.3 | |
Electorate: Valid: 3,484 Spoilt: 71 Quota: 872 Turnout: 3,555 (60.3%)

=== 2012 election ===
2012 Argyll and Bute Council election

Cowal - 3 seats
| Party | Candidate | FPv% | Count | | | | | | | | |
| Party | Candidate | FPv% | 1 | 2 | 3 | 4 | 5 | 6 | 7 | 8 | 9 |
|---|---|---|---|---|---|---|---|---|---|---|---|
| SNP | William Gordon Blair | 19.57% | 570 | 575 | 585 | 613 | 653 | 942 | | | |
| Independent | Alex McNaughton (incumbent) | 18.65% | 543 | 564 | 593 | 628 | 713 | 744 | | | |
| Independent | Bruce Marshall (incumbent) | 12.88% | 375 | 391 | 410 | 452 | 514 | 542 | 572.5 | 577.4 | 742.7 |
| SNP | Ron Simon (incumbent) | 12.12% | 353 | 359 | 367 | 378 | 405 | | | | |
| Conservative | Lewis Macdonald | 11.78% | 343 | 356 | 388 | 407 | 433 | 454 | 480 | 481.9 | |
| Independent | Stephen Johnstone | 9.68% | 282 | 295 | 312 | 341 | | | | | |
| Independent | Chris Talbot | 5.8% | 169 | 182 | 201 | | | | | | |
| Independent | Russell Weir | 5.19% | 151 | 173 | | | | | | | |
| Independent | Chris Lambert | 4.33% | 126 | | | | | | | | |
Electorate: 5,840 Valid: 2,912 Spoilt: 40 Quota: 729 Turnout: 2,952 (49.86%)

=== 2007 election ===
2007 Argyll and Bute Council election

Cowal
| Party | Candidate | FPv% | % | Seat | Count |
|---|---|---|---|---|---|
| SNP | Ron Simon | 1,127 | 29.8 | 1 | 1 |
| Independent | Alex McNaughton | 880 | 23.3 | 2 | 3 |
| Independent | Bruce Marshall | 745 | 19.7 | 3 | 5 |
| Conservative | Dave Petrie | 491 | 13.0 | | |
| Liberal Democrats | Trevor Oxborrow | 346 | 9.2 | | |
| Independent | Iain Jarvis Gow | 192 | 5.1 | | |
