= 2017 Argyll and Bute Council election =

2017 Scottish local government election

← 2012	4 May 2017	2022 →

All 36 seats to Argyll and Bute Council 19 seats needed for a majority
	First party	Second party	Third party
Leader	Sandy Taylor	Dick Walsh	Gary Mulvaney
Party	SNP	Independent	Conservative
Leader's seat	Mid Argyll	Dunoon	Helensburgh Central
Last election	13	15	4
Seats before	8	20	4
Seats won	11	10	9
Seat change	▼2	▼5	▲5
Popular vote	9,174	10,079	8,315
Percentage	27.9%	30.6%	25.3%
Swing	▼2.0%	▼8.0%	▲9.6%
	Fourth party
Leader	Aileen Morton
Party	Liberal Democrats
Leader's seat	Helensburgh Central
Last election	4
Seats before	4
Seats won	6
Seat change	▲2
Popular vote	3,332
Percentage	10.1%
Swing	▼0.7%
- The 11 multi-member wards
Council Leader before election
Dick Walsh
Independent
Council Leader after election
Aileen Morton
Scottish Liberal Democrats (as part of TALIG)

The 2017 Argyll and Bute Council elections took place on 4 May 2017 alongside local elections across Scotland. This was the third local election to take place using the Single Transferable Vote electoral system.

== Background ==
At the previous election in 2012, Independent councillors were the largest grouping on the council, with a total of 15 councillors, while the Scottish National Party (SNP) had 13 councillors. Following that election, an administration was formed between the SNP and the Argyll First group of independent councillors. However, this coalition broke down in 2013, after the SNP National Executive prevented the SNP group forming a coalition with the Scottish Conservatives and the Scottish Liberal Democrats. Four members of the SNP group (former SNP group leader Roddy McCuish, Mary Jean Devon, Michael Breslin and Robert MacIntyre) left the SNP in 2013, following the collapse of the SNP-independent administration, and sat as independents for the remainder of their terms as councillors. A coalition of Independents, Scottish Conservatives, and Liberal Democrats was formed in October 2013, led by an independent councillor, Dick Walsh. The collapse of the SNP-independent administration led to an investigation by Audit Scotland.

A number of councillors who had been elected in 2012 did not serve a full term and resigned prior to the 2017 elections:

- SNP councillor Fred Hall left the SNP group in 2013 and sat as an independent. He resigned in 2014, which led to a by-election in the Oban South and the Isles ward in May 2014, which was won by Neil MacIntyre for Scottish Labour.
- Louise Lee, who had been elected for the SNP for Oban North and Lorn in 2012, also resigned in 2014, resulting in a by-election in July 2014, which was won by the independent candidate John McGregor, who died shortly afterwards. The death of John MacGregor led to another by-election in Oban North and Lorn, which was won by Iain MacLean for the SNP in October 2014. Iain MacLean left the SNP in March 2016 and sat for the remainder of his term as an independent.
- John Semple, SNP councillor for South Kintyre, also resigned after the Scottish Independence referendum, leading to a by-election in December 2014, which was won by John Armour for the SNP.
- Duncan MacIntyre (Independent, Oban North and Lorn) resigned for health reasons in December 2015. His seat was won by Julie MacKenzie for the SNP in February 2016.
- Iain Angus MacDonald, who had originally been elected as an Independent councillor for Oban North and Lorn in 2012, joined the SNP in September 2014, but resigned in March 2016. The resulting by-election in June 2016 was won by an independent, Kieron Green.

Eight of the sitting councillors did not seek re-election, including the outgoing council leader Dick Walsh (Independent), Michael Breslin (Independent, originally SNP), Iain MacLean (Independent, originally SNP)), Vivien Dance (Independent), Bruce Marshall (Independent), Isobel Strong (SNP), Neil MacIntyre (Scottish Labour), and Maurice Corry (Scottish Conservative).

== Results ==
The SNP became the largest party on the council for the first time, as the Independent group lost a third of its seats compared to the previous election. The Conservatives gained five seats and the Liberal Democrats gained two, but both remained in their respective places as the two smaller parties.

Despite the SNP's position, a coalition was formed of Conservatives, Liberal Democrats and Independents, referred to as The Argyll Lomond and the Isles Group (TALIG). Aileen Morton, leader of the group, was elected as council leader.

2017 Argyll and Bute Council election result
Party	Seats	Gains	Losses	Net gain/loss	Seats %	Votes %	Votes	+/−
SNP	11	1	3	▼2	30.5	27.7	9,174	▼2.0
Independent	10	2	7	▼5	27.7	30.4	10,079	▼8.0
Conservative	9	5	0	▲5	25.0	25.1	8,315	▲9.6
Liberal Democrats	6	2	0	▲2	16.6	10.7	3,571	▼0.7
Labour	0	0	0	0	0.0	4.1	1,362	▼0.5
Green	0	0	0	0	0.0	1.8	609	▲1.6
UKIP	0	0	0	0	0.0	0.1	32	New
Total	36						33,110	

== Ward results ==
=== South Kintyre ===
- There was no election for the ward of South Kintyre, a three-member ward, as there were only three candidates nominated: Donald Kelly (Scottish Conservative), John Armour (SNP), and Rory Colville (Liberal Democrat), all of whom were the incumbent councillors for the ward.

South Kintyre - 3 seats
Party	Candidate	FPv%	Count
Party	Candidate	FPv%	1
SNP	John Armour (incumbent)		unopposed
Liberal Democrats	Rory Colville (incumbent)		unopposed
Conservative	Donald Kelly (incumbent)		unopposed

=== Kintyre and the Islands ===
(Includes Colonsay, Gigha, Islay, Jura, Scarba)

- 2012: 1xSNP; 1xIndependent; 1xLib Dem
- 2017: 1xSNP; 1xLib Dem; 1xConservative
- 2012–2017 Change: Conservative gain one seat from Independent

Kintyre and the Islands - 3 seats
Party	Candidate	FPv%	Count				
Party	Candidate	FPv%	1	2	3	4	5
SNP	Anne Horn (incumbent)	29.3	821				
Conservative	Alastair John Redman	23.1	648	652.5	679.1	689.1	707.7
Liberal Democrats	Robin Currie (incumbent)	22.4	626	649.4	694.7	770.7	
Independent	John McAlpine (incumbent)	14.7	411	432.0	473.1	525.7	
Labour	Michael Kelly	5.7	160	169.6			
Green	Ed Tyler	4.8	134	176.9	196.3		
Electorate: TBC Valid: 2,800 Spoilt: 40 Quota: 701 Turnout: 2,840 (54.1%)

=== Mid Argyll ===
- 2012: 2xIndependent; 1xSNP
- 2017: 2xIndependent; 1xSNP
- 2012–2017 Change: No change

Mid Argyll - 3 seats
Party	Candidate	FPv%	Count						
Party	Candidate	FPv%	1	2	3	4	5	6	7
Independent	Douglas Trevor Philand (incumbent)	28.7	948						
SNP	Sandy Taylor (incumbent)	27.5	911						
Conservative	Alec McNeilly	15.9	528	543.4	544.1	560.5	584.2	620.2	
Independent	Donnie MacMillan (incumbent)	12.9	427	467.1	482.3	511.1	603.8	703.9	985.4
Independent	Jane McCurdie	5.7	190	209.7	217.6	243.5			
Green	Elaine Morrison	5.2	171	186.6	226.9	265.4	308.6		
Labour	Jane Kelly	3.9	132	140.7	147.4				
Electorate: TBC Valid: 3,307 Spoilt: 49 Quota: 827 Turnout: 3,356 (54.7%)

=== Oban South and the Isles ===
(Includes Coll, Iona, Mull, Tiree)

- 2012: 3xSNP; 1xIndependent
- 2017: 2xIndependent; 1xSNP; 1xCon
- 2012–2017 Change: Conservative and Independent gain one seat each from SNP

Oban South and the Isles - 4 seats
Party	Candidate	FPv%	Count						
Party	Candidate	FPv%	1	2	3	4	5	6	7
Independent	Roddy McCuish (incumbent)	21.12	808						
Independent	Mary-Jean Devon (incumbent)	19.19	734	744.1	789.8				
Conservative	Jamie McGrigor	16.44	629	636.3	667.9	671.0	712.5	759.0	770.0
SNP	Jim Lynch	16.03	613	616.7	619.8	623.0	637.4	680.0	1164.3
SNP	Sean MacIntyre	13.22	506	511.5	519.5	520.9	539.1	572.7	
Labour	Jake Ainscough	5.91	226	229.0	257.5	259.8	276.8		
Independent	Alistair MacDougall (incumbent)	4.05	155	158.2	169.5	179.3			
Liberal Democrats	David Pollard	4.03	154	156.4					
Electorate: Valid: 3,825 Spoilt: 66 Quota: 766 Turnout: 3,891 (47.5%)

=== Oban North and Lorn ===
- 2012: 3xIndependent; 1xSNP
- 2017: 2xIndependent; 1xSNP; 1xCon
- 2012–2017 Change: Conservative gain from Independent

Oban North and Lorn - 4 seats
Party	Candidate	FPv%	Count							
Party	Candidate	FPv%	1	2	3	4	5	6	7	8
Independent	Elaine Robertson (incumbent)	22.01	913							
Conservative	Andrew Vennard	17.11	710	721.8	727.9	746.5	769.4	789.6	814.1	828.4
SNP	Julie McKenzie (incumbent)	16.63	690	694.6	698.6	704.8	717.1	754.8	829.2	1356.5
SNP	Breege Smyth	12.97	538	543.1	546.1	548.2	562.2	581.5	647.2	
Independent	Kieron Green (incumbent)	11.69	485	515.8	519.3	563.3	600.5	677.0	764.2	797.0
Green	William Mohieddeen	7.33	304	307.5	308.5	320.6	328.0	342.4		
Independent	Neil MacKay	4.39	182	189.5	210.3	222.4	262.5			
Independent	Grant Nicholson	3.71	154	159.2	166.7	177.0				
Independent	Brian Burnett	2.68	111	115.0	118.1					
Independent	Allan McKie	1.49	62	64.3						
Electorate: Valid: 4,149 Spoilt: 51 Quota: 830 Turnout: 4,200 (52.0%)

=== Cowal ===
- 2012: 2xIndependent; 1xSNP
- 2017: 1xSNP; 1xConservative; 1xLiberal Democrat
- 2012–2017 Change: Conservative & Liberal Democrat each gain one seat from Independent

Cowal - 3 seats
Party	Candidate	FPv%	Count			
Party	Candidate	FPv%	1	2	3	4
SNP	William Gordon Blair (incumbent)	26.3	918			
Conservative	Yvonne McNeilly	26.2	912			
Liberal Democrats	Alan Reid	22.7	791	794.5	810.7	899.1
Independent	Alex McNaughton (incumbent)	11.2	389	391.6	400.7	428.5
SNP	Alison Mulholland	8.2	287	323.0	323.4	344.8
Labour	Susanna Rice	5.4	187	188.2	191.3	
Electorate: Valid: 3,484 Spoilt: 71 Quota: 872 Turnout: 3,555 (60.3%)

=== Dunoon ===
- 2012: 2xIndependent; 1xSNP
- 2017: 1xSNP; 1xCon; 1xIndependent
- 2012–2017 Change: Con gain one seat from Independent

Dunoon - 3 seats
Party	Candidate	FPv%	Count							
Party	Candidate	FPv%	1	2	3	4	5	6	7	8
SNP	Audrey Forrest	19.66	575	580	593	600	616	638	670	1,064
Conservative	Bobby Good	18.26	534	539	557	584	602	643	732	
SNP	Keir Low	14.05	411	421	423	437	455	467	487	
Independent	Jim Anderson	10.70	313	339	353	391	412	542	658	687
Liberal Democrats	Ross Moreland	9.03	264	275	286	306	372	406		
Independent	John Allison	7.38	216	237	256	305	330			
Labour	Mick Rice	6.67	195	203	216	227				
Independent	Gordon McKinven	5.26	154	164	195					
Independent	Jimmy McQueen (incumbent)	4.85	142	150						
Independent	Brian Logan	4.14	121							
Electorate: Valid: 2,925 Spoilt: 72 Quota: 732 Turnout: 2,997 (53.1%)

=== Isle of Bute ===
- 2012: 2xSNP; 1xIndependent
- 2017: 2xIndependent; 1xSNP
- 2012–2017 Change: Independent gain one seat from SNP

Isle of Bute - 3 seats
Party	Candidate	FPv%	Count						
Party	Candidate	FPv%	1	2	3	4	5	6	7
Independent	Jean Moffat	19.06	472	494	588	657			
SNP	Jim Findlay	17.5	433	437	461	709			
Conservative	Peter Wallace	17.2	427	437	482	492	496.8	504.0	
SNP	Robert MacIntyre (incumbent)	15.9	395	402	433				
Independent	Len Scoullar (incumbent)††	13.7	340	354	440	502	524.2	537.2	740.5
Independent	Fraser Gillies	13.1	325	343					
Independent	John McCallum	3.4	85						
Electorate: Valid: 2,477 Spoilt: 61 Quota: 620 Turnout: 2,538 (51.6%)

=== Lomond North ===
- 2012: 2xIndependent; 1xCon
- 2017: 1xCon; 1xSNP; 1xIndependent;
- 2012–2017 Change: SNP gain from Independent

Lomond North - 3 seats
Party	Candidate	FPv%	Count					
Party	Candidate	FPv%	1	2	3	4	5	6
Conservative	Barbara Morgan†††	29.39	989					
SNP	Iain Shony Paterson	20.15	678	679.8	688.1	710.8	759.1	813.3
Independent	George Freeman (incumbent)	17.40	587	613.0	636.8	687.5	822.9	1152.3
Independent	Fiona Baker	12.10	407	437.3	473.7	531.0	623.6	
Independent	Robert Graham MacIntyre (incumbent)	10.67	359	375.9	386.4	426.4		
Labour	Fiona Howard	6.30	212	228.2	280.1			
Liberal Democrats	Paul Kennedy	3.95	133	157.4				
Electorate: Valid: 3,365 Spoilt: 30 Quota: 842 Turnout: 3,395 (55.4%)

=== Helensburgh Central ===
- 2012: 1xIndependent; 1xSNP; 1xCon; 1xLib Dem
- 2017: 1xCon; 1xSNP; 2xLib Dem
- 2012–2017 Change: Lib Dem gain from Independent

Helensburgh Central - 4 seats
Party	Candidate	FPv%	Count				
Party	Candidate	FPv%	1	2	3	4	5
Conservative	Gary Mulvaney (incumbent)	46.33	1789				
SNP	Lorna Douglas	22.61	873				
Liberal Democrats	Aileen Morton (incumbent)	17.97	694	1075.6			
Liberal Democrats	Graham Hardie	6.68	258	356.8	563.2	589.6	864.3
Independent	James Alexander Robb (incumbent)	6.39	247	478.1	526.2	558.6	
Electorate: Valid: 3,861 Spoilt: 56 Quota: 773 Turnout: 3,917 (51.7%)

=== Helensburgh and Lomond South ===
- 2012: 1xLib Dem; 1xSNP; 1xCon
- 2017: 1xLib Dem; 1xSNP; 1xCon
- 2012–2017 Change: No Change

Helensburgh and Lomond South - 3 seats
Party	Candidate	FPv%	Count							
Party	Candidate	FPv%	1	2	3	4	5	6	7	8
Conservative	David Fairbairn Kinniburgh (incumbent)	38.96	1149							
SNP	Richard MacDonald Trail (incumbent)	17.80	525	528.2	529.6	534.7	563.0	583.4	594.2	730.7
Liberal Democrats	Ellen Morton (incumbent)†	13.97	412	521.5	527.0	540.5	615.5	847.2		
Labour	Christopher Fagan	8.48	250	287.2	291.6	305.4				
Independent	Mike Crowe	8.41	248	309.2	321.2	377.8	434.3	484.0	509.5	
Liberal Democrats	Jacqueline Davis	8.10	239	299.1	304.3	322.8	394.9			
Independent	Ian Macquire	3.19	94	119.8	129.0					
UKIP	Jack Streeter	1.09	32	57.0						
Electorate: Valid: 2,949 Spoilt: 32 Quota: 738 Turnout: 2,981 (52.3%)

== Changes since 2017 ==
- † Helensburgh and Lomond South Liberal Democrat Cllr Ellen Morton died on 10 May 2020. The by-election occurred on 18 March 2021, being won by the Conservative candidate.
- †† Isle of Bute Independent Cllr Len Scoullar died on 15 November 2020 following a battle with illness. The by-election took place on 18 March 2021 and was won by an Independent.
- ††† Lomond North Conservative Cllr Barbara Morgan announced her resignation from the Council in October 2021. The by-election was held on 16 December 2021.

== By-Elections since 2017 ==
Lomond North By-election (16 December 2021) - 1 Seat
Party	Candidate	FPv%	Count			
Party	Candidate	FPv%	1	2	3	4
Conservative	Paul Collins	40.7	742	786	805	1,100
SNP	Ken Smith	25.2	459	489		
Independent	Mark Irvine	22.9	418	494	711	
Independent	Robert MacIntyre	11.2	204			
Valid: 1,823 Spoilt: 19 Quota: 912 Turnout: (29.6%)

Isle of Bute By-election (18 March 2021) - 1 Seat
Party	Candidate	FPv%	Count				
Party	Candidate	FPv%	1	2	3	4	5
SNP	Kim Findlay	32.7	658	688	701	767	
Independent	Liz McCabe	20.4	411	475	564	772	1,034
Independent	Fraser Gillies	19.0	382	419	539		
Conservative	Peter Wallace	16.8	338	367			
Labour	Dawn MacDonald	11.1	224				
Electorate: TBC Quota: 1,007 Turnout: (42.4%)

Helensburgh and Lomond South By-election (18 March 2021) - 1 Seat
Party	Candidate	FPv%	Count
Party	Candidate	FPv%	1
Conservative	Gemma Penfold	50.7	1,206
SNP	Math Campbell-Sturgess	23.6	562
Liberal Democrats	Henry Boswell	14.0	333
Labour	Jane Kelly	5.6	133
Green	Mike Crowe	5.2	123
Workers Party	Paul Burrows	0.9	22
Electorate: TBC Valid: 2,379 Spoilt: 15 Quota: 1,190 Turnout: (41.8%)
