= 2022 Argyll and Bute Council election =

Argyll and Bute Council election

- 5 May 2022

All 36 seats to Argyll and Bute Council 19 seats needed for a majority
- Registered: 69,469
- Turnout: 50.4%
	First party	Second party
	SNP	Con
Leader	Jim Lynch	Gary Mulvaney
Party	SNP	Conservative
Leader's seat	Oban South and the Isles	Helensburgh Central
Last election	11 seats, 27.6%	9 seats, 25%
Seats before	11	8
Seats after	12	10
Seat change	▲1	▲1
Popular vote	10,729	7,845
Percentage	31.0%	22.7%
Swing	▲3.3%	▼2.4%
	Third party	Fourth party
	Ind	LD
Leader		Robin Currie
Party	Independent	Liberal Democrats
Leader's seat	N/A	Kintyre and the Islands
Last election	10 seats, 30.4%	6 seats, 10.7%
Seats before	10	5
Seats after	7	5
Seat change	▼3	▼1
Popular vote	8,742	3,325
Percentage	25.3%	9.6%
Swing	▼2.4%	▼1.1%
	Fifth party	Sixth party
	Lab	Grn
Leader	Fiona Howard	Luna Martin
Party	Labour	Green
Leader's seat	Helensburgh Central	Oban North and Lorn
Last election	0 seats, 4.1%	0 seats, 1.8%
Seats before	0	0
Seats after	1	1
Seat change	▲1	▲1
Popular vote	2,218	1,334
Percentage	6.4%	3.9%
Swing	▲2.3%	▲2.1%
Leader before election
Robin Currie
(Lib Dems)
No overall control
Leader after election
Robin Currie
(Lib Dems)
No overall control

Elections to Argyll and Bute Council took place on 5 May 2022, the same day as the 31 other Scottish local government elections. As with other Scottish council elections, it was held using single transferable vote (STV)—a form of proportional representation—in which multiple candidates are elected in each ward and voters rank candidates in order of preference. New ward boundaries were proposed by Boundaries Scotland in 2021, which would have reduced the total number of councillors to 34. However, these were rejected by the Scottish Parliament and the boundaries used at the previous election remained in place.

For the second consecutive election, the Scottish National Party (SNP) were returned as the largest party with 12 seats—one more than in 2017 but seven short of an overall majority. The Conservatives solidified the gains they had made at the previous election and increased their number by one to return 10 councillors and become the second-largest group on the council. The number of independent councillors fell by almost one third to seven while the Liberal Democrats lost one seat to return five councillors. The remaining two seats were won by Labour and the Greens.

The incumbent Conservative-Liberal Democrat-independent coalition—known as The Argyll, Lomond and Islands group (TALIG)—retained control of the council, with Cllr Robin Currie re-elected as council leader and Maurice Corry elected as Provost.

== Background ==
=== Previous election ===
At the previous election in 2017, the Scottish National Party (SNP) became the largest party despite losing two seats, overtaking the number of independents which fell by five. A coalition of independents, Conservatives and Liberal Democrats retained control of the council after the Conservatives made five gains and the Liberal Democrats increased their number by two.

2017 Argyll and Bute Council election result
Party	Seats	Vote share
SNP	11	27.7%
Independent	10	30.4%
Conservatives	9	25.1%
Liberal Democrats	6	10.8%

=== Electoral system ===
The election used the eight wards created under the Local Governance (Scotland) Act 2004, with 28 councillors being elected. Each ward elected either 3 or 4 members, using the single transferable vote (STV) electoral system—a form of proportional representation—where candidates are ranked in order of preference.

=== Composition ===
After the 2017 election, a few changes in the composition of the council happened. Changes in the political affiliation of councillors occurred when Conservative councillor Alastair Redman was suspended over Islamophobia allegations and independent councillor Roddy McCuish joined the Independence for Scotland Party. In the run-up to the election, Conservative councillors Donald Kelly and Jamie McGrigor were deselected by the party but continued on as independents. Cllr McGrigor was subsequently expelled by the party for standing as an independent. Three by-elections were held and resulted in an independent hold, a Conservative gain from the Lib Dems and a Conservative hold.

Composition of Argyll and Bute Council
Party	2017 result	Dissolution
SNP	11	11
Independents	10	12
Conservative	9	7
Liberal Democrats	6	5
ISP	0	1

=== Retiring councillors ===
Retiring councillors
Ward	Party	Retiring councillor
Kintyre and the Islands	SNP	Anne Horn
Mid Argyll	SNP	Sandy Taylor
Oban South and the Isles	Independent	Mary-Jean Devon
Oban South and the Isles	ISP	Roddy McCuish
Oban North and Lorn	Independent	Elaine Robertson
Cowal	Liberal Democrats	Alan Reid
Dunoon	Independent	Jim Anderson
Dunoon	Conservative	Bobby Good
Isle of Bute	SNP	Jim Findlay
Lomond North	Conservative	Paul Collins
Helensburgh Central	SNP	Lorna Douglas
Helensburgh Central	Liberal Democrats	Aileen Morton
Helensburgh and Lomond South	SNP	Richard Trail

=== Proposed boundary changes ===
Following the passing of the Islands (Scotland) Act 2018, a review of the boundaries was undertaken in North Ayrshire, Argyll and Bute, Highland, Orkney Islands, Shetland Islands and Comhairle nan Eilean Siar. The Act allowed single- or two-member wards to be created to provide better representation of island communities. New ward boundaries were proposed by Boundaries Scotland in 2021 which would have increased the number of wards by one to 12 but reduced the number of councillors by two to 34. Two new two-member, island-only wards would have been created to represent Islay, Jura and Colonsay and Mull, Iona, Coll and Tiree. As a result, the Kintyre peninsula would have been represented by a single ward instead of multiple wards which cover a mix of mainland and island communities.

The proposals would have made no changes to the boundaries or numbers of councillors in Cowal; Dunoon and Lomond North. The boundaries in Isle of Bute would have remained the same, but the number of councillors would have been reduced from three to two. Minimal changes would have been made to the boundaries of Helensburgh Central and Helensburgh and Lomond South, but the number of councillors in Helensburgh Central would have been reduced by one from four to three. Oban would have been placed in its own ward with four members, and a new two-member Lorn ward including the inhabited island of Lismore would have been created. However, the proposals in Argyll and Bute were rejected by the Scottish Parliament and the 11 wards created under the Local Governance (Scotland) Act 2004 remained in place.

=== Candidates ===
The total number of candidates increased from 77 in 2017 to 79. The number of independent candidates—25—outstripped any individual party but fell by four from the previous election. The SNP and Conservatives both stood 13 candidates; more than any other party. The SNP's total was a reduction of three from the previous election whereas the Conservatives increased their number by two. Both the Liberal Democrats and Labour increased their number of candidates by one from the previous election—standing 11 and eight respectively—while the Greens stood five candidates, two more than five years previous. For the first time, the Independence for Scotland Party (ISP) (two), the Scottish Family Party (one) and the Alba Party (one) fielded candidates in an Argyll and Bute election. Unlike the 2017 election, the UK Independence Party (UKIP) did not field any candidates.

== Results ==
2022 Argyll and Bute Council election result
Party	Seats	Gains	Losses	Net gain/loss	Seats %	Votes %	Votes	+/−
SNP	12	1	0	▲1	33.3	31.0	10,729	▲3.3
Conservative	10	2	1	▲1	27.8	22.7	7,845	▼2.4
Independent	7	2	5	▼3	19.4	25.3	8,742	▼2.4
Liberal Democrats	5	1	2	▼1	13.9	9.6	3,325	▼1.1
Labour	1	1	0	▲1	2.8	6.4	2,218	▲2.3
Green	1	1	0	▲1	2.8	3.9	1,334	▲2.1
Alba	0	0	0	Steady	0.0	0.5	172	New
ISP	0	0	0	Steady	0.0	0.5	156	New
Scottish Family	0	0	0	Steady	0.0	0.1	43	New
Total	36						34,564	

=== Ward summary ===
Results of the 2022 Argyll and Bute Council election by ward
Ward	%	Cllrs	%	Cllrs	%	Cllrs	%	Cllrs	%	Cllrs	%	Cllrs	%	Cllrs	Total Cllrs
Ward	SNP		Ind		Con		Lib Dem		Lab		Green		Others		Total Cllrs
South Kintyre	32.8	1	35.9	1	22.5	1	8.7	0							3
Kintyre and the Islands	29.9	1	39.9	1	9.6	0	16.4	1	4.2	0					3
Mid Argyll	31.2	1	46.6	1	11.6	1	3.3	0	4.9	0			2.4	0	3
Oban South and the Isles	38.2	2	29.8	1	12.4	1	5.2	0	4.7	0	9.7	0			4
Oban North and Lorn	30.6	1	31.6	1	18.7	1	6.5	0			9.7	1	2.9	0	4
Cowal	41.9	1	5.2	0	26.1	1	16.8	1	7.7	0			2.4	0	3
Dunoon	40.9	1	16.2	0	17.9	1	16.9	1	6.5	0			1.6	0	3
Isle of Bute	25.4	1	46.1	1	17.8	1	1.1	0	4.3	0	3.0	0	2.4	0	3
Lomond North	24.3	1	34.1	1	26.4	1	2.8	0	12.4	0					3
Helensburgh Central	21.4	1	2.2	0	37.1	1	11.1	1	21.3	1	6.8	0			4
Helensburgh and Lomond South	26.0	1			47.7	1	17.8	1			8.6	0			3
Total	31.0	12	25.3	7	22.7	10	9.6	5	6.4	1	3.9	1	1.1	0	36

=== Seats changing hands ===
Below is a list of seats which elected a different party or parties from 2017 in order to highlight the change in the political composition of the council from the previous election. The list does not include defeated incumbents who resigned or defected from their party and subsequently failed re-election while the party held the seat.

Seats changing hands
Seat	2017		2022	
Seat	Party	Member	Party	Member
South Kintyre	Liberal Democrats	Rory Colville	Independent	Donald Kelly
Kintyre and the Islands	Conservative	Alastair Redman	Independent	John McAlpine
Mid Argyll	Independent	Donnie MacMillan	Conservative	Garret Corner
Oban South and the Isles	Independent	Roddy McCuish	SNP	Willie Hume
Oban North and Lorn	Independent	Elaine Robertson	Green	Luna Martin
Dunoon	Independent	Jim Anderson	Liberal Democrats	Ross Moreland
Isle of Bute	Independent	Jean Murray Moffat	Conservative	Peter Wallace
Helensburgh Central	Liberal Democrats	Aileen Morton	Labour	Fiona Howard

Notes

1. Note 1: In 2017, Cllr Kelly was elected as a Conservative candidate but was later deselected by the party. The Conservatives held their seat in South Kintyre at the 2022 election.
2. Note 2: In 2017, Alastair Redman was elected as a Conservative candidate but was later expelled from the party. He did not retain his seat as an independent candidate at the 2022 election.

== Ward results ==
=== South Kintyre ===
The SNP and Conservatives retained the seats they had won at the previous election while independent candidate Donald Kelly gained a seat from the Lib Dems. In 2017, Cllr Kelly was elected as a Conservative candidate, however, he was deselected by the party in the run-up to the 2022 election and chose to stand as an independent.

South Kintyre − 3 seats
Party	Candidate	FPv%	Count	
Party	Candidate	FPv%	1	2
Independent	Donald Kelly (incumbent)	35.9	848	
SNP	John Armour (incumbent)	32.8	773	
Conservative	Tommy MacPherson	22.5	531	615
Liberal Democrats	Rory Colville (incumbent)	8.7	206	310
Electorate: 5,123 Valid: 2,358 Spoilt: 47 Quota: 590 Turnout: 46.9%

=== Kintyre and the Islands ===
The SNP and Lib Dems retained the seats they had won at the previous election while the Conservatives lost their seat to independent candidate John McAlpine. In 2017, independent candidate Alastair Redman was elected as a Conservative candidate before being suspended by the party. He did not retain his seat but was subsequently re-elected following a by-election in September 2022.

Kintyre and the Islands − 3 seats
Party	Candidate	FPv%	Count					
Party	Candidate	FPv%	1	2	3	4	5	6
SNP	Dougie McFadzean	29.9	863					
Independent	John McAlpine	23.5	680	705	739			
Liberal Democrats	Robin Currie (incumbent)	16.4	474	515	580	583	670	987
Independent	Alastair Redman (incumbent)	16.4	474	493	502	505	623	
Conservative	Alec McNeilly	9.6	276	277	284	286		
Labour	Jane B. Kelly	4.2	122	140				
Electorate: 5,377 Valid: 2,889 Spoilt: 49 Quota: 723 Turnout: 54.9%

=== Mid Argyll ===
The SNP and independent candidate Dougie Philand retained the seats they had won at the previous election while the Conservatives gained a seat from independent candidate Donnie MacMillan.

Mid Argyll − 3 seats
Party	Candidate	FPv%	Count								
Party	Candidate	FPv%	1	2	3	4	5	6	7	8	9
Independent	Dougie Philand (incumbent)	35.9	1,148								
SNP	Jan Brown	31.2	993								
Conservative	Garret Corner	11.6	371	402	404	406	419	427	460	502	661
Labour	Lesley Burt	4.9	157	178	204	215	271	292			
Independent	Donnie MacMillan (incumbent)	4.7	149	249	273	280	299	329	365		
Independent	Andy Cameron	4.4	140	209	228	249	271	314	385	496	
Liberal Democrats	David Barton	3.3	107	135	152	162					
ISP	Ross Alistair Weir	2.4	78	107	153	164	172				
Independent	Abisola Adepetun	1.9	54	68	74						
Electorate: 6,222 Valid: 3,197 Spoilt: 37 Quota: 800 Turnout: 52.0%

=== Oban South and the Isles ===
The SNP and Conservatives retained the seats they had won at the previous election while the SNP and independent candidate Andrew Kain gained a seat from former independent councillors Roddy McCuish and Mary-Jean Devon. In 2017, Jamie McGrigor was elected as a Conservative candidate, however, he was deselected by the party in the run-up to the 2022 election and chose to stand as an independent. Roddy McCuish was elected as an independent candidate at the 2017 election before joining the Independence for Scotland Party. He stood down prior to the 2022 election.

Oban South and the Isles − 4 seats
Party	Candidate	FPv%	Count									
Party	Candidate	FPv%	1	2	3	4	5	6	7	8	9	10
SNP	Jim Lynch (incumbent)	21.3	773									
SNP	Willie Hume	16.9	615	645	648	657	667	705	724	777		
Conservative	Amanda Hampsey	12.4	452	452	460	479	522	538	601	645	646	667
Green	Phyl Stuart Meyer	9.7	353	357	368	392	401	436	491	520	539	
Independent	Andrew Kain	8.1	295	295	304	314	354	393	439	529	540	698
Independent	Colin Kennedy	7.0	256	257	269	276	309	378	405			
Independent	Donnie Campbell	6.5	235	235	247	257	280					
Liberal Democrats	Henry Drummond Boswell	5.2	188	188	197	255	282	302				
Independent	Jamie McGrigor (incumbent)	4.9	179	180	214	226						
Labour	Gopi Ageer	4.7	169	169	176							
Independent	John Watson	3.2	118	120								
Electorate: 8,092 Valid: 3,633 Spoilt: 62 Quota: 727 Turnout: 45.7%

=== Oban North and Lorn ===
The SNP, Conservatives and independent candidate Kieron Green retained the seats they had won at the previous election while the Greens gained one seat from retiring independent councillor Elaine Robertson.

Oban North and Lorn − 4 seats
Party	Candidate	FPv%	Count						
Party	Candidate	FPv%	1	2	3	4	5	6	7
SNP	Julie McKenzie (incumbent)	30.6	1,254						
Conservative	Andrew Vennard (incumbent)	18.7	767	772	779	788	842		
Independent	Kieron Green (incumbent)	15.4	632	679	703	748	811	819	1,107
Independent	Linda Battison	11.4	466	490	519	571	631	637	
Green	Luna Martin	9.7	396	583	624	716	784	785	897
Liberal Democrats	Veronica Davis	6.5	267	290	305	318			
Independent	Kyle Campbell-Renton	4.8	198	223	245				
Alba	Angus Files	2.9	117	158					
Electorate: 8,369 Valid: 4,097 Spoilt: 33 Quota: 820 Turnout: 49.3%

=== Cowal ===
The SNP, Conservatives and Lib Dems retained the seats they had won at the previous election.

Cowal − 3 seats
Party	Candidate	FPv%	Count					
Party	Candidate	FPv%	1	2	3	4	5	6
SNP	Gordon Blair (incumbent)	33.3	1,090					
Conservative	Yvonne McNeilly (incumbent)	26.1	855					
Liberal Democrats	William Sinclair	16.8	551	563	577	587	669	857
SNP	Lachie MacQuarie	8.6	282	503	503	532	566	596
Labour	Mark Feinmann	7.7	251	262	267	273	303	
Independent	Kenneth White	5.2	170	174	179	201		
ISP	Fiona Nelson	2.4	78	83	85			
Electorate: 5,991 Valid: 3,277 Spoilt: 64 Quota: 820 Turnout: 55.8%

=== Dunoon ===
The SNP and Conservatives retained the seats they had won at the previous election while the Lib Dems gained a seat from retiring independent councillor Jim Anderson.

Dunoon − 3 seats
Party	Candidate	FPv%	Count						
Party	Candidate	FPv%	1	2	3	4	5	6	7
SNP	Audrey E. Forrest (incumbent)	40.9	1,126						
Conservative	Daniel Hampsey	17.9	493	501	512	528	556	560	747
Liberal Democrats	Ross Moreland	16.9	464	539	544	646	710		
Independent	Gordon Graham McKinven	10.1	279	324	336	365	485	492	
Labour	Kaitlin Wallace	6.5	180	247	254				
Independent	George Darroch	6.1	168	249	266	296			
Scottish Family	Susan Watling	1.6	43	62					
Electorate: 5,613 Valid: 2,753 Spoilt: 39 Quota: 689 Turnout: 49.7%

=== Isle of Bute ===
The SNP and independent candidate Liz McCabe retained the seats they had won at the previous election while the Conservatives gained a seat from independent candidate Jean Murray Moffat.

Isle of Bute − 3 seats
Party	Candidate	FPv%	Count								
Party	Candidate	FPv%	1	2	3	4	5	6	7	8	9
SNP	Reeni Kennedy-Boyle	25.4	591								
Independent	Liz McCabe (incumbent)	23.7	553	554	557	573	590				
Conservative	Peter Wallace	17.8	414	414	418	418	422	422	438	485	633
Independent	Jean Murray Moffat (incumbent)	13.7	320	321	326	344	358	361	384	483	
Independent	Fraser Gillies	8.7	202	202	205	209	213	215	241		
Labour	Dawn Malcolm	4.3	101	101	106	108	128	129			
Green	Ewan Stuart	3.0	70	71	73	79					
Alba	Robert McGowan	2.4	55	55	55						
Liberal Democrats	Derek John McFarlane	1.1	25	25							
Electorate: 4,866 Valid: 2,331 Spoilt: 32 Quota: 583 Turnout: 48.6%

=== Lomond North ===
The SNP and Conservatives retained the seats they had won at the previous election while independent candidate Mark Irvine gained a seat from independent candidate George Freeman.

Lomond North − 3 seats
Party	Candidate	FPv%	Count						
Party	Candidate	FPv%	1	2	3	4	5	6	7
Conservative	Maurice Corry	26.4	843						
SNP	Shonny Iain Paterson (incumbent)	24.3	777	777	786	813			
Independent	Mark Irvine	14.9	475	481	497	550	553	680	1,021
Independent	George Freeman (incumbent)	14.6	466	478	489	521	524	672	
Labour	Watson Robinson	12.4	397	404	442	461	464		
Independent	Robert Graham MacIntyre	4.7	149	151	161				
Liberal Democrats	Nigel Ford Millar	2.8	91	95					
Electorate: 6,257 Valid: 3,198 Spoilt: 38 Quota: 800 Turnout: 51.7%

=== Helensburgh Central ===
The SNP and Conservatives retained the seats they had won at the previous election while the Lib Dems held one of their two seats and Labour gained a seat from the Lib Dems.

Helensburgh Central − 4 seats
Party	Candidate	FPv%	Count						
Party	Candidate	FPv%	1	2	3	4	5	6	7
Conservative	Gary Mulvaney (incumbent)	30.5	1,205						
SNP	Ian James MacQuire	21.4	843						
Labour	Fiona Howard	21.3	841						
Liberal Democrats	Graham Hardie (incumbent)	11.1	440	480	485	505	530	716	1,009
Green	Sarah Davies	6.8	268	274	305	314	341		
Conservative	Alison Willmot	6.6	262	601	603	610	627	645	
Independent	James Alexander Robb	2.2	88	93	95	98			
Electorate: 7,759 Valid: 3,947 Spoilt: 55 Quota: 790 Turnout: 51.6%

=== Helensburgh and Lomond South ===
The SNP, Conservatives and Lib Dems retained the seats they had won at the previous election. Following a by-election gain from the Lib Dems in 2021, the Conservatives held two of the three seats immediately prior to the election.

Helensburgh and Lomond South − 3 seats
Party	Candidate	FPv%	Count				
Party	Candidate	FPv%	1	2	3	4	5
Conservative	Gemma Penfold (incumbent)	29.6	854				
SNP	Math Campbell-Sturgess	26.0	749				
Conservative	David Kinniburgh (incumbent)	18.1	522	633	633	647	
Liberal Democrats	Paul Donald Kennedy	17.8	512	522	525	701	1,054
Green	Howard Green	8.6	247	250	268		
Electorate: 5,800 Valid: 2,884 Spoilt: 41 Quota: 722 Turnout: 50.4%

== Aftermath ==
Despite losing seats, the incumbent Conservative-Liberal Democrat-independent coalition—known as The Argyll, Lomond and Islands group (TALIG)—retained control of the council and Liberal Democrat councillor Robin Currie was re-elected as council leader while Conservative councillor Gary Mulvaney was elected as deputy leader. Cllr Maurice Corry was elected as Provost and Cllr Liz McCabe was elected as deputy Provost.

Following the first meeting of the council, SNP group leader Jim Lynch accused the Liberal Democrats of "betrayal" after it emerged that Cllr Currie had approached the SNP group about coalition talks. However, Cllr Currie denied there had been a betrayal, adding it was "not how I see things on the ground" and that "naturally" TALIG would form the administration as the largest group.

In December 2022, South Kintyre councillor Tommy MacPherson resigned from the ruling TALIG coalition citing concerns with the way the group operates. Cllr MacPherson had been elected as a Conservative councillor but sat as an independent following his resignation after being suspended from the Conservative group. In February 2023, the suspension was made permanent. Despite sitting as an independent, Cllr MacPherson remained a member of the Conservative Party.

After a national freeze in council tax was announced by First Minister Humza Yousaf, Argyll and Bute Council voted to raise council tax by 10 per cent in February 2024. A row between the ruling TALIG administration and the Strategic Opposition Partnership resulted in an attempt by the opposition to take control of the council on 4 April 2024. A tied-vote for both council leader and Provost saw the opposition group take control of the council following a cut of a deck of cards. SNP councillor Jim Lynch took over as council leader from Cllr Currie and independent councillor Dougie Philand took over as Provost from Cllr Corry. The council subsequently voted to freeze the council tax.

During 2024, Cllr Ian MacQuire became an independent councillor and was no longer part of the SNP.

In February 2025, Cllr Alastair Redman was suspended by the Standards Commission for two months after making disrespectful and discriminatory comments about a child.

In August 2025, Cllr Garret Corner resigned from the Conservatives and the opposition TALIG group and became an independent unionist councillor.

In December 2025, Cllr Julie McKenzie resigned from the SNP to sit as an independent citing concerns over "bullying and disrespectful behaviour" that had not been addressed and a "politically-motivated witch hunt" against her.

Dunoon councillor Daniel Hampsey defected from the Conservatives to Reform UK in January 2026.

In March 2026, Luna Martin, the council's only Green councillor, defected to the SNP.

=== 2022 Kintyre and the Islands by-election ===
Independent Kintyre and the Islands councillor John McAlpine died on 18 July 2022. A by-election took place on 29 September 2022 and was won by independent candidate Alastair Redman who had previously represented the ward between 2017 and 2022.

Kintyre and the Islands − 1 seat (29 September 2022)
Party	Candidate	FPv%	Count					
Party	Candidate	FPv%	1	2	3	4	5	6
Independent	Alastair Redman	32.7	591	597	618	701	826	1,029
SNP	Lachie Macquarie	29.0	525	536	623	626	694	
Liberal Democrats	Kenny MacKenzie	14.6	265	283	313	375		
Conservative	Hamish Stewart	10.7	194	200	207			
Green	Tom Skinner	9.7	176	179				
Labour	Gopi Ageer	0.3	55					
Electorate: 5,368 Valid: 1,806 Spoilt: 25 Quota: 904 Turnout: 34.1%

=== South Kintyre by-election ===
Independent South Kintyre councillor Donald Kelly resigned his seat in August 2023 in protest at how the council operated. A by-election took place on 2 November 2023 and was won by his daughter, Jennifer Kelly, who also stood as an independent.

South Kintyre − 1 seat (2 November 2023)
Party	Candidate	FPv%	Count
Party	Candidate	FPv%	1
Independent	Jennifer Kelly	57.3	913
SNP	John Richardson	17.0	271
Conservative	Joe Cunningham	13.0	208
Liberal Democrats	Kenny MacKenzie	11.4	183
Freedom Alliance (UK)	Alan McManus	0.4	7
Electorate: 5,088 Valid: 1,582 Spoilt: 10 Quota: 792 Turnout: 31.3%

=== 2024 Kintyre and the Islands by-election ===
Liberal Democrat Kintyre and the Islands councillor and former council leader Robin Currie died suddenly in May 2024. A by-election was held on 18 July 2024 and was won by SNP candidate Anne Horn.

Kintyre and the Islands − 1 seat (18 July 2024)
Party	Candidate	FPv%	Count				
Party	Candidate	FPv%	1	2	3	4	5
SNP	Anne Horn	43.4	728	731	793	832	1,013
Independent	Donald Kelly	19.2	322	327	397	531	
Conservative	Elizabeth Redman	19.2	322	326	369		
Liberal Democrats	Douglas MacDonald	16.7	281	286			
Freedom Alliance (UK)	Alan McManus	1.5	25				
Electorate: 5,406 Valid: 1,678 Spoilt: 17 Quota: 840 Turnout: 31.4%

=== Mid Argyll by-election ===
Provost Dougie Philand, independent councillor for Mid Argyll, died in August 2026. A by-election will be held.

Mid Argyll − 1 seat (29 October 2026)
Party	Candidate	FPv%	Count				
Party	Candidate	FPv%	1	2	3	4	5
SNP	Andy Buntin		820				
Liberal Democrats	Douglas McDonald		310				
Conservative	Colvin Osborn		230				
Reform	Kaine McConnell		151				
Restore	George Love		124				
ISP	Fiona Nelson		95				
Independent	David Moncrieff		50				
Electorate: 6,113 Valid: 1,780 Spoilt: 18 Quota: 891 Turnout: 29.4%
