= Helensburgh Central (ward) =

Ward used to elect members of Argyll and Bute Council, in Scotland

Location of the ward

Helensburgh Central is one of the eleven wards used to elect members of the Argyll and Bute Council. It elects four Councillors.

== Councillors ==
| Election | Councillors | | | |
|---|---|---|---|---|
| 2007 | Vivien Dance (Ind.) | Gary Mulvaney (Conservative) | James Alexander Robb (SNP) | Al Reay (Liberal Democrats) |
| 2012 | Vivien Dance (Ind.) | Gary Mulvaney (Conservative) | James Alexander Robb (SNP) | Aileen Morton (Liberal Democrats) |
| 2017 | Graham Hardie (Liberal Democrats) | Gary Mulvaney (Conservative) | Lorna Douglas (SNP) | Aileen Morton (Liberal Democrats) |
| 2022 | Graham Hardie (Liberal Democrats) | Gary Mulvaney (Conservative) | Ian James MacQuire (SNP) | Fiona Howard (Labour) |

== Election results ==
=== 2022 election ===
Helensburgh Central − 4 seats
| Party | Candidate | FPv% | Count | | | | | | |
| Party | Candidate | FPv% | 1 | 2 | 3 | 4 | 5 | 6 | 7 |
|---|---|---|---|---|---|---|---|---|---|
| Conservative | Gary Mulvaney (incumbent) | 30.5 | 1,205 | | | | | | |
| SNP | Ian James MacQuire | 21.4 | 843 | | | | | | |
| Labour | Fiona Howard | 21.3 | 841 | | | | | | |
| Liberal Democrats | Graham Hardie (incumbent) | 11.1 | 440 | 480 | 485 | 505 | 530 | 716 | 1,009 |
| Scottish Green | Sarah Davies | 6.8 | 268 | 274 | 305 | 314 | 341 | | |
| Conservative | Alison Willmot | 6.6 | 262 | 601 | 603 | 610 | 627 | 645 | |
| Independent | James Alexander Robb | 2.2 | 88 | 93 | 95 | 98 | | | |
Electorate: 7,759 Valid: 3,947 Spoilt: 55 Quota: 790 Turnout: 51.6%

=== 2017 election ===
2017 Argyll and Bute Council election

Helensburgh Central - 4 seats
| Party | Candidate | FPv% | Count | | | | |
| Party | Candidate | FPv% | 1 | 2 | 3 | 4 | 5 |
|---|---|---|---|---|---|---|---|
| Conservative | Gary Mulvaney (incumbent) | 46.33 | 1789 | | | | |
| SNP | Lorna Douglas | 22.61 | 873 | | | | |
| Liberal Democrats | Aileen Morton (incumbent) | 17.97 | 694 | 1075.6 | | | |
| Liberal Democrats | Graham Hardie | 6.68 | 258 | 356.8 | 563.2 | 589.6 | 864.3 |
| Independent | James Alexander Robb (incumbent) | 6.39 | 247 | 478.1 | 526.2 | 558.6 | |
Electorate: Valid: 3,861 Spoilt: 56 Quota: 773 Turnout: 3,917 (51.7%)

=== 2012 election ===
2012 Argyll and Bute Council election

Helensburgh Central - 4 seats
| Party | Candidate | FPv% | Count |
| Party | Candidate | FPv% | 1 |
|---|---|---|---|
| Independent | Vivien Dance (incumbent) | 22.8% | 749 |
| SNP | James Alexander Robb (incumbent) | 20.91% | 687 |
| Conservative | Gary Mulvaney (incumbent) | 20.49% | 673 |
| Liberal Democrats | Aileen Morton | 20.24% | 665 |
| Independent | David Alastair Allan | 11.63% | 382 |
| | Richard William Humphrey | 3.93% | 129 |
Electorate: 7,377 Valid: 3,285 Spoilt: 32 Quota: 658 Turnout: 3,317 (44.53%)

=== 2007 election ===
2007 Argyll and Bute Council election

2007 Council election: Helensburgh Central
| Party | Candidate | FPv% | % | Seat | Count |
|---|---|---|---|---|---|
| Conservative | Gary Mulvaney | 1,220 | 27.7 | 1 | 1 |
| SNP | James Alexander Robb†† | 822 | 18.6 | 4 | 4 |
| Liberal Democrats | Aileen Morton | 734 | 16.6 | | |
| Liberal Democrats | Al Reay††††† | 728 | 16.5 | 2 | 4 |
| Independent | Vivien Dance | 707 | 16.0 | 3 | 4 |
| Independent | Richard William Humphrey | 198 | 4.5 | | |
