= Dunoon (ward) =

Electoral ward in Argyll and Bute, Scotland

Location of the ward

Dunoon is one of the eleven wards used to elect members of the Argyll and Bute Council. It elects three Councillors.

== History ==
On 26 January 2026, Daniel Hampsey defected to Reform UK.

== Councillors ==
Year	Councillors		
2007	Dick Walsh (Ind.)	Jimmy McQueen (Ind.)	Alister MacAlister (SNP)
2012	Dick Walsh (Ind.)	Jimmy McQueen (Ind.)	Michael Breslin (SNP)
2017	Jim Anderson (Ind.)	Bobby Good (Conservative)	Audrey Forrest (SNP)
2022	Ross Moreland (Liberal Democrats)	Daniel Hampsey (Conservative/ Reform UK)	Audrey Forrest (SNP)
2026	Ross Moreland (Liberal Democrats)	Daniel Hampsey (Conservative/ Reform UK)	Audrey Forrest (SNP)

== Election results ==
=== 2022 election ===
Dunoon − 3 seats
Party	Candidate	FPv%	Count						
Party	Candidate	FPv%	1	2	3	4	5	6	7
SNP	Audrey E. Forrest (incumbent)	40.9	1,126						
Conservative	Daniel Hampsey	17.9	493	501	512	528	556	560	747
Liberal Democrats	Ross Moreland	16.9	464	539	544	646	710		
Independent	Gordon Graham McKinven	10.1	279	324	336	365	485	492	
Labour	Kaitlin Wallace	6.5	180	247	254				
Independent	George Darroch	6.1	168	249	266	296			
Scottish Family	Susan Watling	1.6	43	62					
Electorate: 5,613 Valid: 2,753 Spoilt: 39 Quota: 689 Turnout: 49.7%

=== 2017 election ===
2017 Argyll and Bute Council election

Dunoon - 3 seats
Party	Candidate	FPv%	Count							
Party	Candidate	FPv%	1	2	3	4	5	6	7	8
SNP	Audrey Forrest	19.66	575	580	593	600	616	638	670	1,064
Conservative	Bobby Good	18.26	534	539	557	584	602	643	732	
SNP	Keir Low	14.05	411	421	423	437	455	467	487	
Independent	Jim Anderson	10.70	313	339	353	391	412	542	658	687
Liberal Democrats	Ross Moreland	9.03	264	275	286	306	372	406		
Independent	John Allison	7.38	216	237	256	305	330			
Labour	Mick Rice	6.67	195	203	216	227				
Independent	Gordon McKinven	5.26	154	164	195					
Independent	Jimmy McQueen (incumbent)	4.85	142	150						
Independent	Brian Logan	4.14	121							
Electorate: Valid: 2,925 Spoilt: 72 Quota: 732 Turnout: 2,997 (53.1%)

=== 2012 election ===
2012 Argyll and Bute Council election

Dunoon - 3 seats *
Party	Candidate	FPv%	Count				
Party	Candidate	FPv%	1	2	3	4	5
Independent	Dick Walsh (incumbent)	32.83	777				
SNP	Michael Breslin	28.01	663				
Independent	Jimmy McQueen (incumbent)	18.25	432	527.5	544.8	590.7	638
Labour	Mick Rice	12.51	296	315.5	324.7	337.8	381.4
Liberal Democrats	Tony Miles	4.44	105	128.1	137.3	160.1	
Conservative	William Green	3.97	94	106.9	111.1		
Electorate: 5,715 Valid: 2,367 Spoilt: 38 Quota: 592 Turnout: 2,405 (41.42%)

=== 2007 election ===
2007 Argyll and Bute Council election

Dunoon
Party	Candidate	FPv%	%	Seat	Count
Independent	Dick Walsh	855	24.6	1	2
SNP	Alister MacAlister††††††	821	23.6	3	4
Independent	Jimmy McQueen	754	21.7	2	4
Labour	David Graham	358	10.3		
Liberal Democrats	Tony Miles	257	7.4		
Conservative	Sandy MacPherson	239	6.9		
Independent	Gordon McKinven	193	5.6		
