= Lomond North (ward) =

Electoral ward in Argyll and Bute, Scotland

Location of the ward

Lomond North is one of the eleven wards used to elect members of the Argyll and Bute Council. It elects three Councillors.

== Councillors ==
Election	Councillors		
2007	Billy Petrie (Ind.)	Danny Kelly (Ind.)	George Freeman (Ind.)
2012	Robert Graham MacIntyre (Ind.)	Maurice Corry (Conservative)	George Freeman (Ind.)
2017	Iain Shony Paterson (SNP)	Barbara Morgan (Conservative)	George Freeman (Ind.)
2022	Iain Shony Paterson (SNP)	Maurice Corry (Conservative)	Mark Irvine (Ind.)

== Election results ==
=== 2022 election ===
Lomond North − 3 seats
Party	Candidate	FPv%	Count						
Party	Candidate	FPv%	1	2	3	4	5	6	7
Conservative	Maurice Corry	26.4	843						
SNP	Shonny Iain Paterson (incumbent)	24.3	777	777	786	813			
Independent	Mark Irvine	14.9	475	481	497	550	553	680	1,021
Independent	George Freeman (incumbent)	14.6	466	478	489	521	524	672	
Labour	Watson Robinson	12.4	397	404	442	461	464		
Independent	Robert Graham MacIntyre	4.7	149	151	161				
Liberal Democrats	Nigel Ford Millar	2.8	91	95					
Electorate: 6,257 Valid: 3,198 Spoilt: 38 Quota: 800 Turnout: 51.7%

=== 2017 election ===
2017 Argyll and Bute Council election

Lomond North - 3 seats
Party	Candidate	FPv%	Count					
Party	Candidate	FPv%	1	2	3	4	5	6
Conservative	Barbara Morgan	29.39	989					
SNP	Iain Shony Paterson	20.15	678	679.8	688.1	710.8	759.1	813.3
Independent	George Freeman (incumbent)	17.4	587	613.0	636.8	687.5	822.9	1152.3
Independent	Fiona Baker	12.10	407	437.3	473.7	531.0	623.6	
Independent	Robert Graham MacIntyre (incumbent)	10.67	359	375.9	386.4	426.4		
Labour	Fiona Howard	6.30	212	228.2	280.1			
Liberal Democrats	Paul Kennedy	3.95	133	157.4				
Electorate: Valid: 3,365 Spoilt: 30 Quota: 842 Turnout: 3,395 (55.4%)

=== 2012 election ===
2012 Argyll and Bute Council election

Lomond North - 3 seats
Party	Candidate	FPv%	Count					
Party	Candidate	FPv%	1	2	3	4	5	6
Independent	George Freeman (incumbent)	29.24%	847					
Conservative	Maurice Corry	18.78%	544	560.3	565.7	607.6	672.1	716.3
SNP	Kenneth Smith	14.01%	406	417.1	433.1	463.4	542.1	
Labour	Fiona Howard	12.98%	376	386.4	412.1	453.4		
Independent	Robert Graham MacIntyre	12.36%	358	373.8	407.2	531.7	650.9	816.1
Independent	Danny Kelly (incumbent)	8.18%	237	272.1	307.5			
Independent	Susie Will	4.45%	129	143.5				
Electorate: 6,117 Valid: 2,897 Spoilt: 22 Quota: 725 Turnout: 2,919 (47.36%)

=== 2007 election ===
2007 Argyll and Bute Council election

Lomond North
Party	Candidate	FPv%	%	Seat	Count
Independent	Billy Petrie	794	22.2	1	3
Independent	Danny Kelly	734	20.5	2	4
Independent	George Freeman	616	17.2	3	6
SNP	Elizabeth Buist	557	15.6		
Conservative	James Proctor	484	13.5		
Liberal Democrats	Andrew Nisbet	395	11.0		
