= Mid Argyll (ward) =

Location of the ward

Mid Argyll is one of the eleven wards used to elect members of the Argyll and Bute Council in Scotland. It elects three Councillors every 5 years.

== Councillors ==
Election	Councillors		
2007	Douglas Trevor Philand (Ind.)	Donnie MacMillan (Ind.)	Alison Hay (Liberal Democrats)
2012	Douglas Trevor Philand (Ind.)	Donnie MacMillan (Ind.)	Sandy Taylor (SNP)
2017	Douglas Trevor Philand (Ind.)	Donnie MacMillan (Ind.)	Sandy Taylor (SNP)
2022	Douglas Trevor Philand (Ind.)	Garret Corner (Conservative)	Jan Brown (SNP)
2026	Andy Buntin (SNP)	Garret Corner (Conservative)	Jan Brown (SNP)

== Election results ==
=== 2026 by-election ===
A by-election was held after the death of Councillor Dougie Philand in August 2026.

Mid Argyll − 1 seat (29 October 2026)
Party	Candidate	FPv%	Count				
Party	Candidate	FPv%	1	2	3	4	5
SNP	Andy Buntin		820				
Liberal Democrats	Douglas McDonald		310				
Conservative	Colvin Osborn		230				
Reform	Kaine McConnell		151				
Restore	George Love		124				
ISP	Fiona Nelson		95				
Independent	David Moncrieff		50				
Electorate: 6,113 Valid: 1,780 Spoilt: 18 Quota: 891 Turnout: 29.4%

=== 2022 election ===
Mid Argyll − 3 seats
Party	Candidate	FPv%	Count								
Party	Candidate	FPv%	1	2	3	4	5	6	7	8	9
Independent	Dougie Philand (incumbent)	35.9	1,148								
SNP	Jan Brown	31.2	993								
Conservative	Garret Corner	11.6	371	402	404	406	419	427	460	502	661
Labour	Lesley Burt	4.9	157	178	204	215	271	292			
Independent	Donnie MacMillan (incumbent)	4.7	149	249	273	280	299	329	365		
Independent	Andy Cameron	4.4	140	209	228	249	271	314	385	496	
Liberal Democrats	David Barton	3.3	107	135	152	162					
ISP	Ross Alistair Weir	2.4	78	107	153	164	172				
Independent	Abisola Adepetun	1.9	54	68	74						
Electorate: 6,222 Valid: 3,197 Spoilt: 37 Quota: 800 Turnout: 52.0%

=== 2017 election ===
Mid Argyll - 3 seats
Party	Candidate	FPv%	Count						
Party	Candidate	FPv%	1	2	3	4	5	6	7
Independent	Douglas Trevor Philand (incumbent)	28.7	948						
SNP	Sandy Taylor (incumbent)	27.5	911						
Conservative	Alec McNeilly	15.9	528	543.4	544.1	560.5	584.2	620.2	
Independent	Donnie MacMillan (incumbent)	12.9	427	467.1	482.3	511.1	603.8	703.9	985.4
Independent	Jane McCurdie	5.7	190	209.7	217.6	243.5			
Green	Elaine Morrison	5.2	171	186.6	226.9	265.4	308.6		
Labour	Jane Kelly	3.9	132	140.7	147.4				
Electorate: TBC Valid: 3,307 Spoilt: 49 Quota: 827 Turnout: 3,356 (54.7%)

=== 2012 Election ===
Mid Argyll - 3 seats
Party	Candidate	FPv%	Count				
Party	Candidate	FPv%	1	2	3	4	5
Independent	Douglas Trevor Philand (incumbent)	38.42%	1,111				
SNP	Sandy Taylor	24.62%	712	811.6			
Independent	Donnie MacMillan (incumbent)	14.14%	409	518.7	543.6	598.7	677.9
Liberal Democrats	Alison Jean Hay (incumbent)	10.79%	312	387.2	401.1	483.4	528.5
Conservative	Charlotte Hanbury	6.02%	174	190.7	193.6		
Labour	Wendy Reynolds	6.02%	174	209.1	222.9	231.9	
Electorate: 5,999 Valid: 2,892 Spoilt: 24 Quota: 724 Turnout: 2,916 (48.21%)

=== 2007 Election ===
Mid Argyll
Party	Candidate	FPv%	%	Seat	Count
Liberal Democrats	Alison Hay	813	22.0	1	4
Independent	Donnie MacMillan	699	18.9	2	6
SNP	Colin Stevenson	625	16.9		
Independent	Douglas Trevor Philand	582	15.7	3	8
Independent	Sandy Cameron	344	9.3		
Conservative	Charlotte Hanbury	305	8.2		
Labour	Wendy Reynolds	225	6.1		
Independent	Cameron Lewis	106	2.9		
