= 2007 Argyll and Bute Council election =

2007 Scottish local government election

- 3 May 2007

All 36 seats to Argyll and Bute Council 19 seats needed for a majority
	First party	Second party	Third party
Party	Independent	SNP	Liberal Democrats
Seats won	16	10	7
Seat change	▼6	▲7	▼1
Popular vote	15,715	8,921	7,702
Percentage	39.1%	22.2%	19.2%
Swing	▼12.4%	▲9.0%	▲4.9%
	Fourth party
Party	Conservative
Seats won	3
Seat change	Steady
Popular vote	6,301
Percentage	15.7%
Swing	▼1.7%
Council Leader before election
Allan MacAskill
Independent
Council Leader
Dick Walsh
Independent

Elections to Argyll and Bute Council were held on 3 May 2007 the same day as the other Scottish local government elections and the Scottish Parliament general election. The election was the first one using 11 new wards created as a result of the Local Governance (Scotland) Act 2004, each ward will elect three or four councillors using the single transferable vote system form of proportional representation. The new wards replace 36 single-member wards which used the plurality (first past the post) system of election.

== Election result ==
Argyll and Bute local election result 2007
Party	Seats	Gains	Losses	Net gain/loss	Seats %	Votes %	Votes	+/−
Independent	16	N/A	N/A	▼6	44.4	39.1	15,715	▼12.4
SNP	10	N/A	N/A	▲7	27.8	22.2	8,921	▲9.0
Liberal Democrats	7	N/A	N/A	▼1	19.4	19.2	7,702	▲4.9
Conservative	3	N/A	N/A	Steady	8.3	15.7	6,301	▼1.7
Labour	0	N/A	N/A	±0	0.0	3.7	1,471	▲1.0
Solidarity	0	N/A	N/A	±0	0.0	0.2	76	New

== Ward results ==
Incumbent councillors are marked with *

=== South Kintyre ===
South Kintyre
Party	Candidate	FPv%	Count			
Party	Candidate	FPv%	1	2	3	4
Conservative	Donald Kelly*	42.9%	1,332			
SNP	John Donald Semple	21.3%	663	710	743	845
Labour	George McMillan	14.3%	444	495	508	
Liberal Democrats	Rory Colville*	14.2%	441	505	512	658
Conservative	James Martin	4.9%	152	503	514	575
Solidarity	Deirdre Henderson	2.4%	76	83		
Electorate: 5,503 Valid: 3,108 Spoilt: 57 Quota: 778 Turnout: 57.51%

=== Kintyre and the Islands ===
Kintyre and the Islands
Party	Candidate	FPv%	Count				
Party	Candidate	FPv%	1	2	3	4	5
Liberal Democrats	Robin Currie*	34.6%	1,131				
Independent	John McAlpine*	18.6%	608	637	685	726	825
SNP	Anne Horn	14.7%	482	525	556	601	678
Independent	Ann Newman	10.5%	342	434	450	547	607
Conservative	Peter Minshall	9.2%	300	317	370	387	
Labour	Phil Hawkins	6.7%	219	284	295		
Independent	Maureen Scott	5.8%	190	195			
Electorate: 5,307 Valid: 3,272 Spoilt: 45 Quota: 819 Turnout: 62.50%

=== Mid Argyll ===
Mid Argyll
Party	Candidate	FPv%	Count					
Party	Candidate	FPv%	1	2	3	4	5	6
Liberal Democrats	Alison Hay*	22.0%	813	833	880	975		
Independent	Donnie MacMillan*	18.9%	699	712	733	794	806	964
SNP	Colin Stevenson	16.9%	625	632	672	693	700	735
Independent	Douglas Trevor Philand	15.7%	582	608	650	674	681	796
Independent	Sandy Cameron	9.3%	344	359	375	414	420	
Conservative	Charlotte Hanbury	8.2%	305	312	318			
Labour	Wendy Reynolds	6.1%	225	230				
Independent	Cameron Lewis	2.9%	106					
Electorate: 5,948 Valid: 3,699 Spoilt: 49 Quota: 925 Turnout: 63.01%

=== Oban South and the Isles ===
Oban South and the Isles
Party	Candidate	FPv%	Count						
Party	Candidate	FPv%	1	2	3	4	5	6	7
SNP	Roddy McCuish	23.3%	955						
Liberal Democrats	Mary-Jean Devon †	16.4%	672	674	684	820			
SNP	Donald Skye McIntosh* ††††	12.4%	506	579	593	613	614	653	761
Independent	Gordon Chalmers	10.9%	444	445	450	458	458	592	617
Conservative	Roy Rutherford	10.1%	413	417	440	473	473	496	550
Independent	Alastair MacDougall*	8.5%	347	348	376	389	390		
Liberal Democrats	Nicola Welsh	7.2%	293	299	317				
Independent	Neil MacKinnon MacIntyre	7.1%	290	315	354	391	391	427	
Independent	Roderick MacEachen	3.5%	143	145					
Independent	David Gallant	0.7%	27	27					
Electorate: 7,401 Valid: 4,090 Spoilt: 98 Quota: 819 Turnout: 56.59%

=== Oban North and Lorn ===
Oban North and Lorn
Party	Candidate	FPv%	Count							
Party	Candidate	FPv%	1	2	3	4	5	6	7	8
Independent	Elaine Robertson*	22.0%	1,005							
Independent	Duncan MacIntyre	17.1%	779	801	821	872	934			
Liberal Democrats	Neil MacKay †††	14.6%	665	678	701	726	772	777	846	951
SNP	Donald MacDonald	13.6%	618	620	632	654	672	673	694	724
SNP	Mike MacKenzie	8.8%	401	407	411	419	434	435	466	486
Conservative	Eileen Mary Kirkpatrick	8.5%	387	394	404	419	427	429	457	
Independent	Ian Smyth	4.4%	200	211	222	240	267	271		
Independent	Sidney MacDougall*	4.1%	188	192	209	229				
Independent	George Doyle	3.9%	176	179	198					
Independent	Gwen Cameron	3.1%	140	146						
Electorate: 7,431 Valid: 4,559 Spoilt: 87 Quota: 912 Turnout: 62.52%

=== Cowal ===
Cowal
Party	Candidate	FPv%	Count				
Party	Candidate	FPv%	1	2	3	4	5
SNP	Ron Simon	29.8%	1,127				
Independent	Alex McNaughton	23.3%	880	909	996		
Independent	Bruce Marshall*	19.7%	745	768	813	829	956
Conservative	Dave Petrie	13.0%	491	504	523	530	630
Liberal Democrats	Trevor Oxborrow	9.2%	346	376	391	397	
Independent	Iain Jarvis Gow	5.1%	192	203			
Electorate: 5,878 Valid: 3,781 Spoilt: 61 Quota: 946 Turnout: 65.36%

=== Dunoon ===
Dunoon
Party	Candidate	FPv%	Count			
Party	Candidate	FPv%	1	2	3	4
Independent	Dick Walsh*	24.6%	855	938		
SNP	Alister MacAlister ††††††	23.6%	821	836	845	870
Independent	Jimmy McQueen*	21.7%	754	804	829	903
Labour	David Graham	10.3%	358	371	376	384
Liberal Democrats	Tony Miles	7.4%	257	269	278	336
Conservative	Sandy MacPherson	6.9%	239	245	252	
Independent	Gordon McKinven*	5.6%	193			
Electorate: 5,862 Valid: 3,477 Spoilt: 45 Quota: 870 Turnout: 60.08%

=== Isle of Bute ===
Isle of Bute
Party	Candidate	FPv%	Count				
Party	Candidate	FPv%	1	2	3	4	5
Independent	Len Scoullar*	28.2%	868				
SNP	Robert MacIntyre*	27.2%	839				
SNP	Isobel Strong*	17.9%	551	597	647	667	730
Independent	Fraser Gillies	7.7%	238	251	255	303	333
Labour	Harry Hattan	7.3%	225	228	230	236	
Liberal Democrats	Karen Anne Hilton	7.1%	218	226	229	258	308
Conservative	Peter Wallace	4.6%	143	152	154		
Electorate: 5,354 Valid: 3,082 Spoilt: 66 Quota: 771 Turnout: 58.80%

=== Lomond North ===
Lomond North
Party	Candidate	FPv%	Count			
Party	Candidate	FPv%	1	2	3	4
Independent	Billy Petrie*	22.2%	794	893	1,083	
Independent	Danny Kelly*	20.5%	734	786	855	905
Independent	George Freeman*	17.2%	616	658	738	784
SNP	Elizabeth Buist	15.6%	557	604	649	669
Conservative	James Proctor	13.5%	484	548		
Liberal Democrats	Andrew Nisbet	11.0%	395			
Electorate: 6,239 Valid: 3,580 Spoilt: 35 Quota: 896 Turnout: 57.94%

=== Helensburgh Central ===
Helensburgh Central
Party	Candidate	FPv%	Count		
Party	Candidate	FPv%	1	2	3
Conservative	Gary Mulvaney*	27.7%	1,220		
SNP	James Alexander Robb ††	18.6%	822	844	865
Liberal Democrats	Aileen Morton	16.6%	734	782	811
Liberal Democrats	Al Reay* †††††	16.5%	728	808	849
Independent	Vivien Dance	16.0%	707	772	852
Independent	Richard William Humphrey	4.5%	198	228	
Electorate: 7,617 Valid: 4,409 Spoilt: 67 Quota: 882 Turnout: 58.76%

=== Helensburgh and Lomond South ===
Helensburgh and Lomond South
Party	Candidate	FPv%	Count			
Party	Candidate	FPv%	1	2	3	4
Conservative	David Fairbairn Kinniburgh	26.7%	835			
Independent	Ronald Kinloch*	22.8%	713	728	753	815
Liberal Democrats	Ellen Morton*	22.4%	700	712	946	
SNP	Richard MacDonald Trail	18.3%	572	575	597	631
Liberal Democrats	Karen York	9.9%	309	314		
Electorate: 5,596 Valid: 3,129 Spoilt: 34 Quota: 783 Turnout: 56.52%

== Changes since 2007 Election ==
- †In September 2007, Oban South and the Isles Cllr Mary-Jean Devon quit the Liberal Democrats and became an Independent. She joined the Scottish National Party on 1 July 2011.
- ††Since the election, Helensburgh Central Cllr James Robb quit the Scottish National Party and became an Independent Nationalist.
- †††Since the election, Oban North and Lorn Cllr Neil MacKay quit the Liberal Democrats and became an Alliance of Independent Councillor.
- ††††On 18 November 2011, Oban South and the Isles Cllr Donald Skye McIntosh died.
- †††††On 25 February 2012 Hellensburgh Central Cllr Al Reay died.
- ††††††On 30 March 2012 Dunoon Cllr Alister MacAlister died.

== By-Elections since 3 May 2007 ==
- On 4 October 2007 the Liberal Democrats Andrew Nisbit won a by-election which arose following the death of former Independent Councillor Ronald Kinloch on 23 July 2007

Helensburgh and Lomond South by-election 4 October 2007 - 1 Seat
Party	Candidate	FPv%	Count			
Party	Candidate	FPv%	1	2	3	4
Liberal Democrats	Andrew Nisbit	30.31	642	752	1,014	1,525
Conservative	Jim Proctor	29.60	627	684	839	
Independent	Gordon Hanning	23.28	493	606		
SNP	Richard Trail	16.81	356			
Liberal Democrats gain from Independent		Swing				
Electorate: 5,690 Valid: 2,118 Spoilt: 10 Quota: 1,060 Turnout: 2,128 (37.4%)

- On 3 November 2011 the SNP's Louise Glen-Lee won a by-election which arose following the death of former SNP Councillor Donald MacDonald on 4 August 2011

Oban North & Lorn by-election 3 November 2011 - 1 Seat
Party	Candidate	FPv%	Count			
Party	Candidate	FPv%	1	2	3	4
SNP	Louise Glen-Lee	44.14	1,081	1,117	1,179	1,374
Conservative	Roy Rutherford	20.62	505	523	591	758
Independent	Gwyneth Neal	17.88	438	496	561	
Liberal Democrats	David Pollard	10.62	260	273		
Independent	George Doyle	6.73	165			
SNP hold		Swing				
Electorate: 7,606 Valid: 2,449 Spoilt: 19 Quota: 1,225 Turnout: 2,468 (32.4%)
