= Independence for Scotland Party =

- Abbreviation: ISP
- Leader: Colette Walker
- Deputy Leader: Julie McAnulty
- Founded: 7 May 2020; 6 years ago
- Registered: PP11433
- Headquarters: 22 Monteith Gardens; Clarkston; Glasgow; G76 8NU
- Ideology: Scottish independence
- National affiliation: Alliance to Liberate Scotland (2025–26)
- Local government in Scotland: 0 / 1,227

Website
- www.isp.scot

The Independence for Scotland Party (ISP; Scottish Gaelic: Pàrtaidh Neo-eisimeileachd do dh'Alba) is a minor political party in Scotland which supports Scottish independence within the European Free Trade Association (EFTA).

== History ==
The party was founded in 2020 and was registered by the Electoral Commission on 7 May 2020.

On 8 January 2021, former SNP councillor Roddy McCuish became the first elected representative of the ISP, when he joined the party while on Argyll and Bute Council, having been sitting as an independent since his re-election in 2017. McCuish would later announce that he would stand down at the 2022 election.

The ISP had planned to stand fourteen list candidates in the 2021 Scottish Parliament election, one in South Scotland and Glasgow and two in the remaining six regions. However, after the Alba Party announced their formation and decision to compete in the election, they withdrew their candidates.

The ISP contested the 2022 Scottish local elections, running eleven candidates in total. They did not win any seats.

The party leader, Colette Walker, was a candidate in the 2023 Rutherglen and Hamilton West by-election. It was her party's first United Kingdom parliamentary election. She finished in ninth place with 0.68% of the vote, and lost her deposit.

At the 2024 general election, ISP stood two candidates: John Hannah (Bathgate and Linlithgow) and Colette Walker (East Renfrewshire). The party campaigned on a platform of Abstentionism in the election. Both John Hannah and Colette Walker were unsuccessful in their bid to win a seat, receiving 0.9% and 0.6% of votes respectively .

For the 2026 Scottish Parliament election, ISP had planned to stand candidates as part of the Alliance to Liberate Scotland, along with Sovereignty, to avoid splitting the nationalist vote. However, in March 2026, the party withdrew from the alliance, citing concerns over the way in which candidates were selected, following the alliance's registration as a political party the previous month. As a result, the ISP will stand candidates under its own banner in the election.

== Elections contested ==
=== Scottish Parliament ===
Election	Constituency			Regional			Total seats	+/–	Government
Election	Vote	%	Seats	Vote	%	Seats	Total seats	+/–	Government
2026			0 / 73	10,246	0.45%	0 / 56	0 / 129	10th	—N/a

=== United Kingdom House of Commons ===
Leader	Election	Candidates	General		Rank	Notes
Leader	Election	Candidates	Votes	%	Rank	Notes
Colette Walker	2024	2	678	0.00	<80th in UK	Contested Bathgate and Linlithgow and East Renfrewshire.
