= Kintyre and the Islands (ward) =

Electoral ward in Argyll and Bute, Scotland

Location of the ward

Kintyre and the Islands is one of the eleven wards used to elect members of the Argyll and Bute Council in the west of Scotland. It elects three Councillors by single transferable vote. As well as North Kintyre, it includes the islands of Colonsay, Gigha, Islay and Jura.

== Councillors ==
Election	Councillors		
2007	Anne Horn (SNP)	John McAlpine (Ind.)	Robin Currie (Liberal Democrats)
2012	Anne Horn (SNP)	John McAlpine (Ind.)	Robin Currie (Liberal Democrats)
2017	Anne Horn (SNP)	Alastair John Redman (Conservative)	Robin Currie (Liberal Democrats)
2022	Dougie McFadzean (SNP)	John McAlpine (Ind.)	Robin Currie (Liberal Democrats)
2023 by	Dougie McFadzean (SNP)	Alastair Redman (Ind.)	Robin Currie (Liberal Democrats)
2024 by	Dougie McFadzean (SNP)	Alastair Redman (Ind.)	Anne Horn (SNP)

== Election results ==
=== 2024 by-election ===
Kintyre and the Islands − 1 seat (18 July 2024)
Party	Candidate	FPv%	Count				
Party	Candidate	FPv%	1	2	3	4	5
SNP	Anne Horn	43.4	728	731	793	832	1,013
Independent	Donald Kelly	19.2	322	327	397	531	
Conservative	Elizabeth Redman	19.2	322	326	369		
Liberal Democrats	Douglas MacDonald	16.7	281	286			
Freedom Alliance (UK)	Alan McManus	1.5	25				
Electorate: 5,406 Valid: 1,678 Spoilt: 17 Quota: 840 Turnout: 31.4%

=== 2022 by-election ===
Kintyre and the Islands − 1 seat (29 September 2022)
Party	Candidate	FPv%	Count					
Party	Candidate	FPv%	1	2	3	4	5	6
Independent	Alastair Redman	32.7	591	597	618	701	826	1,029
SNP	Lachie Macquarie	29.0	525	536	623	626	694	
Liberal Democrats	Kenny MacKenzie	14.6	265	283	313	375		
Conservative	Hamish Stewart	10.7	194	200	207			
Scottish Green	Tom Skinner	9.7	176	179				
Labour	Gopi Ageer	0.3	55					
Electorate: 5,368 Valid: 1,806 Spoilt: 25 Quota: 904 Turnout: 34.1%

=== 2022 election ===
Kintyre and the Islands − 3 seats
Party	Candidate	FPv%	Count					
Party	Candidate	FPv%	1	2	3	4	5	6
SNP	Dougie McFadzean	29.9	863					
Independent	John McAlpine	23.5	680	705	739			
Liberal Democrats	Robin Currie (incumbent)	16.4	474	515	580	583	670	987
Independent	Alastair Redman (incumbent)	16.4	474	493	502	505	623	
Conservative	Alec McNeilly	9.6	276	277	284	286		
Labour	Jane B. Kelly	4.2	122	140				
Electorate: 5,377 Valid: 2,889 Spoilt: 49 Quota: 723 Turnout: 54.9%

=== 2017 election ===
2017 Argyll and Bute Council election

Kintyre and the Islands - 3 seats
Party	Candidate	FPv%	Count				
Party	Candidate	FPv%	1	2	3	4	5
SNP	Anne Horn (incumbent)	29.3	821				
Conservative	Alastair John Redman	23.1	648	652.5	679.1	689.1	707.7
Liberal Democrats	Robin Currie (incumbent)	22.4	626	649.4	694.7	770.7	
Independent	John McAlpine (incumbent)	14.7	411	432.0	473.1	525.7	
Labour	Michael Kelly	5.7	160	169.6			
Scottish Green	Ed Tyler	4.8	134	176.9	196.3		
Electorate: TBC Valid: 2,800 Spoilt: 40 Quota: 701 Turnout: 2,840 (54.1%)

=== 2012 Election ===
2012 Argyll and Bute Council election

Kintyre and the Islands - 3 seats
Party	Candidate	FPv%	Count						
Party	Candidate	FPv%	1	2	3	4	5	6	7
SNP	Anne Horn (incumbent)	23.43%	610	613	630	694			
Independent	John McAlpine (incumbent)	22.43%	584	587	603	653			
Conservative	Alastair John Redman	21.24%	553	553	559	579	586.2	586.4	
Liberal Democrats	Robin Currie (incumbent)	20.74%	540	541	548	623	635.9	636.2	884.3
Labour	Bob Chicken	8.64%	225	232	247				
Scottish Green	Ed Tyler	2.8%	73	74					
	Arthur McFarlane	0.73%	19						
Electorate: 5,144 Valid: 2,604 Spoilt: 29 Quota: 652 Turnout: 2,633 (50.62%)

=== 2007 election ===
2007 Argyll and Bute Council election

Kintyre and the Islands
Party	Candidate	FPv%	%	Seat	Count
Liberal Democrats	Robin Currie	1,131	34.6	1	1
Independent	John McAlpine	608	18.6	2	5
SNP	Anne Horn	482	14.7	3	7
Independent	Ann Newman	342	10.5		
Conservative	Peter Minshall	300	9.2		
Labour	Phil Hawkins	219	6.7		
Independent	Maureen Scott	190	5.8		
