= 2012 Argyll and Bute Council election =

Scottish local election

- 3 May 2012

All 36 seats to Argyll and Bute Council 19 seats needed for a majority
	First party	Second party	Third party
Leader	Dick Walsh	Roddy McCuish	David Fairbairn Kinniburgh
Party	Independent	SNP	Conservative
Leader's seat	Dunoon	Oban South and the Isles	Helensburgh and Lomond South
Last election	16 seats, 44.4%	10 seats, 27.8%	3 seats, 8.3%
Seats before	16	11	3
Seats won	15	13	4
Seat change	▼1	▲3	▲1
Popular vote	11,922	9,234	4,811
Percentage	38.4%	29.7%	15.5%
Swing	▼0.7%	▲7.5%	▼0.2%
	Fourth party
Leader	Ellen Morton
Party	Liberal Democrats
Leader's seat	Helensburgh and Lomond South
Last election	7 seats, 19.4%
Seats before	6
Seats won	4
Seat change	▼3
Popular vote	3,540
Percentage	11.4%
Swing	▼7.8%
Council Leader before election
Dick Walsh
Independent
Council Leader after election
Roddy McCuish
SNP

Elections to Argyll and Bute Council were held on 3 May 2012, on the same day as the 31 other local authorities in Scotland. The election used the eleven wards created under the Local Governance (Scotland) Act 2004, with 36 councillors being elected. Each ward elected either 3 or 4 members, using the STV electoral system.

After the 2007 local election, a coalition was formed between the Alliance for Independents group and the Scottish National Party. This arrangement subsequently broke up and the Independent group formed a minority administration with the support of the Scottish Liberal Democrats.

The 2012 election saw Independent councillors remain the largest grouping on the Council, while the Scottish National Party increased their representation again by 3 seats, chiefly at the expense of the Lib Dems. The Scottish Conservative and Unionist Party gained an additional seat and replaced the Lib Dems in third place according to vote share.

Following the election an administration was formed between the Scottish National Party and the Argyll First Group of Independent Councillors. However, this coalition subsequently broke down, and after the SNP National Executive prevented the SNP group forming a coalition with the Scottish Conservatives and Liberal Democrats, 4 members of the SNP group including Roddy McCuish, Mary Jean Devon, Michael Breslin and Robert MacIntyre left the SNP, and a coalition of Independents, Scottish Conservatives, and Liberal Democrats was subsequently formed in October 2013, led by Dick Walsh. Another member of the SNP Group, Fred Hall, had previously left the SNP in April 2013, and now sits as an independent.

== Election result ==
Argyll and Bute local election result 2012
Party	Seats	Gains	Losses	Net gain/loss	Seats %	Votes %	Votes	+/−
Independent	15	1	2	-1	41.67	38.40	11,922	-0.7
SNP	13	3	0	+3	36.1	29.74	9,234	+7.54
Conservative	4	1	0	+1	11.1	15.50	4,811	-0.2
Liberal Democrats	4	0	3	-3	11.1	11.40	3,540	-7.8
Labour	0	0	0	0	0.0	4.60	1,422	+0.9
Green	0	0	0	0	0.0	0.24	73	New
Scottish Christian	0	0	0	0	0.0	0.14	45	New

Note: "Votes" are the first preference votes. The net gain/loss and percentage changes relate to the result of the previous Scottish local elections on 3 May 2007. This may differ from other published sources showing gain/loss relative to seats held at dissolution of Scotland's councils.

== Ward results ==
=== South Kintyre ===
- 2007: 1xCon; 1xSNP; 1xLib Dem
- 2012: 1xCon; 1xLib Dem; 1xSNP
- 2007-2012 Change: No change

South Kintyre - 3 seats
Party	Candidate	FPv%	Count						
Party	Candidate	FPv%	1	2	3	4	5	6	7
Conservative	Donald Kelly (incumbent)	45.87%	1,133						
SNP	John Donald Semple (incumbent) ††††	16.80%	415	507.3	517.5	551.5	696.7		
Liberal Democrats	Rory Colville (incumbent)	14.21%	351	519.2	535.1	570.3	595.7	613.7	728.3
SNP	Anne Baird	8.22%	203	216.6	224.4	234.2			
Independent	Robert Graham	6.72%	167	221.9	246.9	315.9	338.7	354.9	
Independent	George Rahman	5.59%	138	192.5	205.5				
Independent	Deirdre Henderson	2.55%	63	85.3					
Electorate: 5,278 Valid: 2,470 Spoilt: 40 Quota: 618 Turnout: 2,510 (46.8%)

=== Kintyre and the Islands ===
- 2007: 1xLib Dem; 1xIndependent; 1xSNP
- 2012: 1xSNP; 1xIndependent; 1xLib Dem
- 2007-2012 Change: No change

Kintyre and the Islands - 3 seats
Party	Candidate	FPv%	Count						
Party	Candidate	FPv%	1	2	3	4	5	6	7
SNP	Anne Horn (incumbent)	23.43%	610	613	630	694			
Independent	John McAlpine (incumbent)	22.43%	584	587	603	653			
Conservative	Alastair John Redman	21.24%	553	553	559	579	586.2	586.4	
Liberal Democrats	Robin Currie (incumbent)	20.74%	540	541	548	623	635.9	636.2	884.3
Labour	Bob Chicken	8.64%	225	232	247				
Green	Ed Tyler	2.80%	73	74					
	Arthur McFarlane	0.73%	19						
Electorate: 5,144 Valid: 2,604 Spoilt: 29 Quota: 652 Turnout: 2,633 (50.62%)

=== Mid Argyll ===
- 2007: 2xIndependent; 1xLib Dem
- 2012: 2xIndependent; 1xSNP
- 2007-2012 Change: SNP gain one seat from Lib Dem

Mid Argyll - 3 seats
Party	Candidate	FPv%	Count				
Party	Candidate	FPv%	1	2	3	4	5
Independent	Douglas Trevor Philand (incumbent)	38.42%	1,111				
SNP	Sandy Taylor	24.62%	712	811.6			
Independent	Donnie MacMillan (incumbent)	14.14%	409	518.7	543.6	598.7	677.9
Liberal Democrats	Alison Jean Hay (incumbent)	10.79%	312	387.2	401.1	483.4	528.5
Conservative	Charlotte Hanbury	6.02%	174	190.7	193.6		
Labour	Wendy Reynolds	6.02%	174	209.1	222.9	231.9	
Electorate: 5,999 Valid: 2,892 Spoilt: 24 Quota: 724 Turnout: 2,916 (48.21%)

=== Oban South and the Isles ===
- 2007: 2xSNP; 1xLib Dem; 1xIndependent
- 2012: 3xSNP; 1xIndependent
- 2007-2012 Change: SNP gain one seat from Lib Dem

Oban South and the Isles - 4 seats
Party	Candidate	FPv%	Count							
Party	Candidate	FPv%	1	2	3	4	5	6	7	8
SNP	Mary-Jean Devon (incumbent) (Subsequently left the SNP)	24.67%	830							
SNP	Roddy McCuish (incumbent) (Subsequently left the SNP)	22.79%	767							
SNP	Fred Hall† (Subsequently left the SNP)	10.37%	349	408.6	461.6	475.2	489.6	523.2	569	632.6
Independent	Alistair MacDougall	8.35%	281	305.4	307.9	333.8	373.4	406	580.9	701.5
Independent	Gordon Chalmers (incumbent)	7.99%	269	305.1	307.1	329.7	370.5	386.2		
Independent	Neil MacKinnon MacIntyre	7.64%	257	260.4	273.9	291.1	327.4	442.7	483.7	
Independent	Sean MacIntyre	7.04%	237	239.8	248.4	266.7	283.9			
Conservative	Michael Hawke	5.68%	191	194	196.4	252.2				
Liberal Democrats	Graham Kanes	5.47%	184	189.5	191.6					
Electorate: 7,615 Valid: 3,365 Spoilt: 51 Quota: 674 Turnout: 3,416 (44.19%)

=== Oban North and Lorn ===
- 2007: 2xIndependent; 1xLib Dem; 1xSNP
- 2012: 3xIndependent; 1xSNP
- 2007-2012 Change: Independent gain one seat from Lib Dem

Oban North and Lorn - 4 seats
Party	Candidate	FPv%	Count								
Party	Candidate	FPv%	1	2	3	4	5	6	7	8	9
Independent	Elaine Robertson (incumbent)	22.23%	807								
SNP	Louise Anne Glen-Lee†† (incumbent)	19.47%	707	715.6	721.9	732					
Independent	Duncan MacIntyre (incumbent)††††††	11.59%	421	436.2	443.7	471.9	472.2	509.6	611.3	726.7	811.4
SNP	Donald Melville	11.29%	410	415.9	420	445.1	448.8	471	517.2	541.9	
Independent	Iain Angus MacDonald †††††	9.94%	361	372.7	379.9	410.8	411.1	437.8	476.8	542.6	645.3
Conservative	Roy Rutherford	9.14%	332	340.1	343.3	353.5	353.6	384.4	409.2		
Independent	Neil MacKay (incumbent)	6.11%	222	231.3	239	243.1	243.3	264.3			
Liberal Democrats	Gwyneth Neal	5.17%	188	196.7	201.1	206.3	206.5				
Independent	George Doyle	3.44%	125	126.9	136.1						
Independent	Wilma McIntosh	1.60%	58	61.3							
Electorate: 7,524 Valid: 3,631 Spoilt: 46 Quota: 727 Turnout: 3,677 (48.26%)

=== Cowal ===
- 2007: 2xIndependent; 1xSNP
- 2012: 2xIndependent; 1xSNP
- 2007-2012 Change: No change

Cowal - 3 seats
Party	Candidate	FPv%	Count								
Party	Candidate	FPv%	1	2	3	4	5	6	7	8	9
SNP	William Gordon Blair	19.57%	570	575	585	613	653	942			
Independent	Alex McNaughton (incumbent)	18.65%	543	564	593	628	713	744			
Independent	Bruce Marshall (incumbent)	12.88%	375	391	410	452	514	542	572.5	577.4	742.7
SNP	Ron Simon (incumbent)	12.12%	353	359	367	378	405				
Conservative	Lewis Macdonald	11.78%	343	356	388	407	433	454	480	481.9	
Independent	Stephen Johnstone	9.68%	282	295	312	341					
Independent	Chris Talbot	5.8%	169	182	201						
Independent	Russell Weir	5.19%	151	173							
Independent	Chris Lambert	4.33%	126								
Electorate: 5,840 Valid: 2,912 Spoilt: 40 Quota: 729 Turnout: 2,952 (49.86%)

=== Dunoon ===
- 2007: 2xIndependent; 1xSNP
- 2012: 2xIndependent; 1xSNP
- 2007-2012 Change: No change

Dunoon - 3 seats *
Party	Candidate	FPv%	Count				
Party	Candidate	FPv%	1	2	3	4	5
Independent	Dick Walsh (incumbent)	32.83	777				
SNP	Michael Breslin (Subsequently left the SNP)	28.01	663				
Independent	Jimmy McQueen (incumbent)	18.25	432	527.5	544.8	590.7	638
Labour	Mick Rice	12.51	296	315.5	324.7	337.8	381.4
Liberal Democrats	Tony Miles	4.44	105	128.1	137.3	160.1	
Conservative	William Green	3.97	94	106.9	111.1		
Electorate: 5,715 Valid: 2,367 Spoilt: 38 Quota: 592 Turnout: 2,405 (41.42%)

- Elections to the Dunoon Ward were suspended following the death of SNP candidate Alister MacAlister. Polling took place on 10 May 2012.

=== Isle of Bute ===
- 2007: 2xSNP; 1xIndependent
- 2012: 2xSNP; 1xIndependent
- 2007-2012 Change: No change

Isle of Bute - 3 seats
Party	Candidate	FPv%	Count					
Party	Candidate	FPv%	1	2	3	4	5	6
Independent	Len Scoullar (incumbent)	30.91%	707					
SNP	Robert MacIntyre (incumbent) (Subsequently left the SNP)	26.63%	609					
SNP	Isobel Strong (incumbent)	15.7%	359	409.6	440.7	450.8	515.1	673.8
Labour	Adam Bellshaw	15.34%	351	372.6	374.8	385.4	440.8	
Conservative	Peter Wallace	9.44%	216	244.5	245.2	264.6		
Scottish Christian	Hugh Cole	1.97%	45	48.6	49			
Electorate: 5,078 Valid: 2,287 Spoilt: 39 Quota: 572 Turnout: 2,326 (45.04%)

=== Lomond North ===
- 2007: 3xIndependent
- 2012: 2xIndependent; 1xCon
- 2007-2012 Change: Con gain one seat from Independent

Lomond North - 3 seats
Party	Candidate	FPv%	Count					
Party	Candidate	FPv%	1	2	3	4	5	6
Independent	George Freeman (incumbent)	29.24%	847					
Conservative	Maurice Corry	18.78%	544	560.3	565.7	607.6	672.1	716.3
SNP	Kenneth Smith	14.01%	406	417.1	433.1	463.4	542.1	
Labour	Fiona Howard	12.98%	376	386.4	412.1	453.4		
Independent	Robert Graham MacIntyre	12.36%	358	373.8	407.2	531.7	650.9	816.1
Independent	Danny Kelly (incumbent)	8.18%	237	272.1	307.5			
Independent	Susie Will	4.45%	129	143.5				
Electorate: 6,117 Valid: 2,897 Spoilt: 22 Quota: 725 Turnout: 2,919 (47.36%)

=== Helensburgh Central ===
- 2007: 1xCon; 1xSNP; 1xLib Dem; 1xIndependent
- 2012: 1xIndependent; 1xSNP; 1xCon; 1xLib Dem
- 2007-2012 Change: No change

Helensburgh Central - 4 seats
Party	Candidate	FPv%	Count
Party	Candidate	FPv%	1
Independent	Vivien Dance (incumbent)	22.80%	749
SNP	James Alexander Robb (incumbent)	20.91%	687
Conservative	Gary Mulvaney (incumbent)	20.49%	673
Liberal Democrats	Aileen Morton	20.24%	665
Independent	David Alastair Allan	11.63%	382
	Richard William Humphrey	3.93%	129
Electorate: 7,377 Valid: 3,285 Spoilt: 32 Quota: 658 Turnout: 3,317 (44.53%)

=== Helensburgh and Lomond South ===
- 2007: 1xCon; 1xLib Dem; 1xIndependent
- 2012: 1xLib Dem; 1xSNP; 1xCon
- 2007-2012 Change: SNP gain one seat from Independent

Helensburgh and Lomond South - 3 seats
Party	Candidate	FPv%	Count			
Party	Candidate	FPv%	1	2	3	4
Liberal Democrats	Ellen Morton (incumbent)	38.30%	895			
SNP	Richard MacDonald Trail	24.99%	584	603.7		
Conservative	David Fairbairn Kinniburgh (incumbent)	23.88%	558	582.2	584.6	877.2
Liberal Democrats	Andrew Nisbet (incumbent)	12.84%	300	548.3	555.8	
Electorate: 5,395 Valid: 2,337 Spoilt: 35 Quota: 585 Turnout: 2,372 (43.32%)

== Changes since 2012 ==
- † Independent Oban South and the Isles Cllr Fred Hall resigned his seat on 14 March 2014. A by-election was held on 23 May 2014 and was won by the Labour Party's Neil MacIntyre.
- †† SNP Oban North and Lorn Cllr Louise Glen-Lee resigned on 30 April 2014 for personal reasons. A by-election was held on 17 July 2014 and was won by the Independent John MacGregor.
- ††† Independent Oban North and Lorn Cllr John MacGregor died on 28 July 2014. A by-election was held to fill the vacancy and was won by the SNP's Iain MacLean on 23 October 2014. He resigned from the SNP and became an Independent on 15 March 2016.
- †††† SNP South Kintyre Cllr John Semple resigned on 19 September 2014 for personal reasons. A by-election was held to fill the vacancy on 11 December 2014 and was won by the SNP's John Armour.
- ††††† Independent Oban North and Lorn Cllr Iain Angus MacDonald joined the SNP and ceased to be an Independent on 24 September 2014. He resigned his seat on 11 March 2016. The by-election was held on 2 June 2016 and was won by the Independent Kieron Green
- †††††† Independent Oban North and Lorn Cllr Duncan McIntyre resigned due to ill health in December 2015. A by-election was held to fill the vacancy on 18 February 2016 which was won by the SNP's Julie McKenzie.

== By-elections ==
Oban South and the Isles By-election (23 May 2014) - 1 Seat
Party	Candidate	FPv%	Count				
Party	Candidate	FPv%	1	2	3	4	5
Labour	Neil MacIntyre	26.27	918	946	1,134	1,413	2,001
SNP	Iain MacLean	28.05	980	988	1,102	1,260	
Liberal Democrats	David Pollard	18.17	635	742	865		
Independent	John MacGregor	17.63	616	688			
Conservative	Andrew Vennard	9.87	345				
Electorate: 8,023 Valid: 3,494 Spoilt: 31 Quota: 1,748 Turnout: 3,525 (43.55%)

Oban North and Lorn By-election (17 July 2014) - 1 Seat
Party	Candidate	FPv%	Count				
Party	Candidate	FPv%	1	2	3	4	5
SNP	Gerry Fisher	24.6	595	635	658		
Independent	John MacGregor †††	22.7	548	614	771	920	1,293
Labour	Kieron Green	21.8	526	572	681	874	
Conservative	Andrew Vennard	18.4	445	493			
Independent	Marri Molloy	12.5	301				
Electorate: 7,821 Valid: 2,415 Spoilt: 28 Quota: 1,208 Turnout: 2,443 (30.88%)

Oban North and Lorn By-election (23 October 2014) - 1 Seat
Party	Candidate	FPv%	Count			
Party	Candidate	FPv%	1	2	3	4
SNP	Iain MacLean	40.9%	1,090	1,102	1,199	1,635
Independent	Stephanie Irvine	23.6%	629	812	1,080	
Labour	Kieron Green	19.9%	530	621		
Conservative	Andrew Vennard	15.6%	415			
Electorate: 8,056 Valid: 2,664 Spoilt: 25 Quota: 1,333 Turnout: 2,689 (33.07%)

South Kintyre By-election (11 December 2014) - 1 Seat
Party	Candidate	FPv%	Count
Party	Candidate	FPv%	1
SNP	John Armour	62.2%	942
Liberal Democrats	Joyce Oxborrow	14.1%	214
Conservative	Charlotte Hanbury	13.4%	203
Labour	Michael Kelly	10.3%	156
Valid: 1,515 Spoilt: 7 Quota: 759 Turnout: 1,522

Oban North and Lorn By-election (18 February 2016) - 1 Seat
Party	Candidate	FPv%	Count			
Party	Candidate	FPv%	1	2	3	4
SNP	Julie McKenzie	42.3%	1,113	1,186	1,241	1,656
Conservative	Andrew Ross Vennard	23.2%	609	640		
Independent	Kieron Green	23.1%	608	721	1,048	
Green	Pat Tyrell	11.4%	300			
Electorate: 7,772 Valid: 2,630 Spoilt: 9 Quota: 1,316 Turnout: 2,639 (33.84%)

Oban North and Lorn By-election (2 June 2016) - 1 Seat
Party	Candidate	FPv%	Count			
Party	Candidate	FPv%	1	2	3	4
SNP	Breege Smyth	39.8	1,055	1,097	1,138	
Independent	Kieron Green	26.8	711	821	1,160	1617
Conservative	Andrew Ross Vennard	22.3	591	668		
Liberal Democrats	David Pollard	11.1	294			
Valid: 2651 Spoilt: 16 Quota: 1,326 Turnout: 2,667 (33.46%)
