= Isle of Bute (ward) =

Electoral ward in Argyll and Bute, Scotland

Location of the ward

Isle of Bute is one of the eleven wards used to elect members of the Argyll and Bute Council. It elects three Councillors by single transferable vote. The ward covers the Isle of Bute.

== Councillors ==
Election	Councillors		
2007	Len Scoullar (Ind.)	Robert MacIntyre (SNP)	Isobel Strong (SNP)
2012	Len Scoullar (Ind.)	Robert MacIntyre (SNP)	Isobel Strong (SNP)
2017	Len Scoullar (Ind.)	Jim Findlay (SNP)	Jean Moffat (Ind.)
2021	Liz McCabe (Ind.)	Jim Findlay (SNP)	Jean Moffat (Ind.)
2022	Liz McCabe (Ind.)	Reeni Kennedy-Boyle (SNP)	Peter Wallace (Conservative)

== Election results ==
=== 2022 election ===
Isle of Bute − 3 seats
Party	Candidate	FPv%	Count								
Party	Candidate	FPv%	1	2	3	4	5	6	7	8	9
SNP	Reeni Kennedy-Boyle	25.4	591								
Independent	Liz McCabe (incumbent)	23.7	553	554	557	573	590				
Conservative	Peter Wallace	17.8	414	414	418	418	422	422	438	485	633
Independent	Jean Murray Moffat (incumbent)	13.7	320	321	326	344	358	361	384	483	
Independent	Fraser Gillies	8.7	202	202	205	209	213	215	241		
Labour	Dawn Malcolm	4.3	101	101	106	108	128	129			
Green	Ewan Stuart	3.0	70	71	73	79					
Alba	Robert McGowan	2.4	55	55	55						
Liberal Democrats	Derek John McFarlane	1.1	25	25							
Electorate: 4,866 Valid: 2,331 Spoilt: 32 Quota: 583 Turnout: 48.6%

=== 2021 by-election ===
Councillor Len Scoullar died on 15 November 2020 following a battle with illness. The by-election took place on 18 March 2021.

Isle of Bute By-election (18th March 2021) - 1 Seat
Party	Candidate	FPv%	Count				
Party	Candidate	FPv%	1	2	3	4	5
SNP	Kim Findlay	32.7	658	688	701	767	
Independent	Liz McCabe	20.4	411	475	564	772	1,034
Independent	Fraser Gillies	19	382	419	539		
Conservative	Peter Wallace	16.8	338	367			
Labour	Dawn MacDonald	11.1	224				
Electorate: TBC Quota: 1,007 Turnout: (42.4%)

=== 2017 election ===
2017 Argyll and Bute Council election

Isle of Bute - 3 seats
Party	Candidate	FPv%	Count						
Party	Candidate	FPv%	1	2	3	4	5	6	7
Independent	Jean Moffat	19.06	472	494	588	657			
SNP	Jim Findlay	17.5	433	437	461	709			
Conservative	Peter Wallace	17.2	427	437	482	492	496.8	504.0	
SNP	Robert MacIntyre (incumbent)	15.9	395	402	433				
Independent	Len Scoullar (incumbent)	13.7	340	354	440	502	524.2	537.2	740.5
Independent	Fraser Gillies	13.1	325	343					
Independent	John McCallum	3.4	85						
Electorate: Valid: 2,477 Spoilt: 61 Quota: 620 Turnout: 2,538 (51.6%)

=== 2012 election ===
2012 Argyll and Bute Council election

Isle of Bute - 3 seats
Party	Candidate	FPv%	Count					
Party	Candidate	FPv%	1	2	3	4	5	6
Independent	Len Scoullar (incumbent)	30.91%	707					
SNP	Robert MacIntyre (incumbent)	26.63%	609					
SNP	Isobel Strong (incumbent)	15.7%	359	409.6	440.7	450.8	515.1	673.8
Labour	Adam Bellshaw	15.34%	351	372.6	374.8	385.4	440.8	
Conservative	Peter Wallace	9.44%	216	244.5	245.2	264.6		
Scottish Christian	Hugh Cole	1.97%	45	48.6	49			
Electorate: 5,078 Valid: 2,287 Spoilt: 39 Quota: 572 Turnout: 2,326 (45.04%)

=== 2007 election ===
2007 Argyll and Bute Council election

Isle of Bute
Party	Candidate	FPv%	%	Seat	Count
Independent	Len Scoullar	868	28.2	1	1
SNP	Robert MacIntyre	839	27.2	2	1
SNP	Isobel Strong	551	17.9	3	6
Independent	Fraser Gillies	238	7.7		
Labour	Harry Hattan	225	7.3		
Liberal Democrats	Karen Anne Hilton	218	7.1		
Conservative	Peter Wallace	143	4.6		
