= South Kintyre (ward) =

Electoral ward in Argyll and Bute, Scotland

Location of the ward

South Kintyre is one of the eleven wards used to elect members of the Argyll and Bute Council. It elects three Councillors.

== Councillors ==
Election	Councillors		
2007	John Armour (SNP)	Donald Kelly (Conservative /Ind.)	Rory Colville (Liberal Democrats)
2012	John Armour (SNP)	Donald Kelly (Conservative /Ind.)	Rory Colville (Liberal Democrats)
2017	John Armour (SNP)	Donald Kelly (Conservative /Ind.)	Rory Colville (Liberal Democrats)
2022	John Armour (SNP)	Donald Kelly (Conservative /Ind.)	Tommy MacPherson (Conservative)
2023	John Armour (SNP)	Jennifer Kelly (Ind.)	Tommy MacPherson (Conservative)

== Election results ==
=== 2023 by-election ===
South Kintyre − 1 seat (2 November 2023)
Party	Candidate	FPv%	Count
Party	Candidate	FPv%	1
Independent	Jennifer Kelly	57.3	913
SNP	John Richardson	17.0	271
Conservative	Joe Cunningham	13.0	208
Liberal Democrats	Kenny MacKenzie	11.4	183
Freedom Alliance (UK)	Alan McManus	0.4	7
Electorate: 5,088 Valid: 1,582 Spoilt: 10 Quota: 792 Turnout: 31.3%

=== 2022 election ===
South Kintyre − 3 seats
Party	Candidate	FPv%	Count	
Party	Candidate	FPv%	1	2
Independent	Donald Kelly (incumbent)	35.9	848	
SNP	John Armour (incumbent)	32.8	773	
Conservative	Tommy MacPherson	22.5	531	615
Liberal Democrats	Rory Colville (incumbent)	8.7	206	310
Electorate: 5,123 Valid: 2,358 Spoilt: 47 Quota: 590 Turnout: 46.9%

=== 2017 election ===
2017 Argyll and Bute Council election

South Kintyre - 3 seats
Party	Candidate	FPv%	Count
Party	Candidate	FPv%	1
SNP	John Armour (incumbent)		unopposed
Liberal Democrats	Rory Colville (incumbent)		unopposed
Conservative	Donald Kelly (incumbent)		unopposed
Quota:

=== 2012 election ===
2012 Argyll and Bute Council election

South Kintyre - 3 seats
Party	Candidate	FPv%	Count						
Party	Candidate	FPv%	1	2	3	4	5	6	7
Conservative	Donald Kelly (incumbent)	45.87%	1,133						
SNP	John Donald Semple (incumbent) ††††	16.80%	415	507.3	517.5	551.5	696.7		
Liberal Democrats	Rory Colville (incumbent)	14.21%	351	519.2	535.1	570.3	595.7	613.7	728.3
SNP	Anne Baird	8.22%	203	216.6	224.4	234.2			
Independent	Robert Graham	6.72%	167	221.9	246.9	315.9	338.7	354.9	
Independent	George Rahman	5.59%	138	192.5	205.5				
Independent	Deirdre Henderson	2.55%	63	85.3					
Electorate: 5,278 Valid: 2,470 Spoilt: 40 Quota: 618 Turnout: 2,510 (46.8%)

=== 2007 election ===
2007 Argyll and Bute Council election

South Kintyre
Party	Candidate	FPv%	%	Seat	Count
Conservative	Donald Kelly	1,332	42.9	1	1
SNP	John Donald Semple	663	21.3	2	4
Labour	George McMillan	444	14.3		
Liberal Democrats	Rory Colville	441	14.2	3	6
Conservative	James Campbell Martin	152	4.9		
Solidarity	Deirdre Henderson	76	2.4		
