= Helensburgh and Lomond South (ward) =

Electoral ward in Argyll and Bute, Scotland

Location of the ward

Helensburgh and Lomond South is one of the eleven wards used to elect members of the Argyll and Bute Council, with three Councillors been elected from this ward.

== Councillors ==
Election	Councillors		
2007	Ronald Kinloch (Independent)	David Fairbairn Kinniburgh (Conservative)	Ellen Morton (Liberal Democrats)
2012	Richard MacDonald Trail (SNP)	David Fairbairn Kinniburgh (Conservative)	Ellen Morton (Liberal Democrats)
2017	Richard MacDonald Trail (SNP)	David Fairbairn Kinniburgh (Conservative)	Ellen Morton (Liberal Democrats)
2021	Richard MacDonald Trail (SNP)	David Fairbairn Kinniburgh (Conservative)	Gemma Penfold (Conservative)
2022	Math Campbell-Sturgess (SNP)	Paul Donald Kennedy (Liberal Democrats)	Gemma Penfold (Conservative)

== Election results ==
=== 2022 election ===
Helensburgh and Lomond South − 3 seats
Party	Candidate	FPv%	Count				
Party	Candidate	FPv%	1	2	3	4	5
Conservative	Gemma Penfold (incumbent)	29.6	854				
SNP	Math Campbell-Sturgess	26.0	749				
Conservative	David Kinniburgh (incumbent)	18.1	522	633	633	647	
Liberal Democrats	Paul Donald Kennedy	17.8	512	522	525	701	1,054
Green	Howard Green	8.6	247	250	268		
Electorate: 5,800 Valid: 2,884 Spoilt: 41 Quota: 722 Turnout: 50.4%

=== 2021 by-election ===
Councillor Ellen Morton died on 3 October 2020 at the age of 76. A by-election was held on 18 March 2021. There were 6 candidates.

Helensburgh and Lomond South By-election (18th March 2021) - 1 Seat
Party	Candidate	FPv%	Count
Party	Candidate	FPv%	1
Conservative	Gemma Penfold	50.7	1,206
SNP	Math Campbell-Sturgess	23.6	562
Liberal Democrats	Henry Boswell	14.0	333
Labour	Jane Kelly	5.6	133
Green	Mike Crowe	5.2	123
Workers Party	Paul Burrows	0.9	22
Electorate: TBC Valid: 2,379 Spoilt: 15 Quota: 1,190 Turnout: (41.8%)

=== 2017 election ===
2017 Argyll and Bute Council election

Helensburgh and Lomond South - 3 seats
Party	Candidate	FPv%	Count							
Party	Candidate	FPv%	1	2	3	4	5	6	7	8
Conservative	David Fairbairn Kinniburgh (incumbent)	38.96	1,149							
SNP	Richard MacDonald Trail (incumbent)	17.80	525	528.2	529.6	534.7	563.0	583.4	594.2	730.7
Liberal Democrats	Ellen Morton (incumbent)	13.97	412	521.5	527.0	540.5	615.5	847.2		
Labour	Christopher Fagan	8.48	250	287.2	291.6	305.4				
Independent	Mike Crowe	8.41	248	309.2	321.2	377.8	434.3	484.0	509.5	
Liberal Democrats	Jacqueline Davis	8.10	239	299.1	304.3	322.8	394.9			
Independent	Ian Macquire	3.19	94	119.8	129.0					
UKIP	Jack Streeter	1.09	32	57.0						
Electorate: Valid: 2,949 Spoilt: 32 Quota: 738 Turnout: 2,981 (52.3%)

=== 2012 election ===
2012 Argyll and Bute Council election

Helensburgh and Lomond South - 3 seats
Party	Candidate	FPv%	Count			
Party	Candidate	FPv%	1	2	3	4
Liberal Democrats	Ellen Morton (incumbent)	38.30%	895			
SNP	Richard MacDonald Trail	24.99%	584	603.7		
Conservative	David Fairbairn Kinniburgh (incumbent)	23.88%	558	582.2	584.6	877.2
Liberal Democrats	Andrew Nisbet (incumbent)	12.84%	300	548.3	555.8	
Electorate: 5,395 Valid: 2,337 Spoilt: 35 Quota: 585 Turnout: 2,372 (43.32%)

=== 2007 election ===
2007 Argyll and Bute Council election

2007 Council election: Helensburgh and Lomond South
Party	Candidate	FPv%	%	Seat	Count
Conservative	David Fairbairn Kinniburgh	835	26.7	1	1
Independent	Ronald Kinloch	713	22.8	3	4
Liberal Democrats	Ellen Morton	700	22.4	2	3
SNP	Richard MacDonald Trail	572	18.3		
Liberal Democrats	Karen York	309	9.9		
