= Maurice Corry =

Scottish politician (born 1950)

Maurice Corry TD
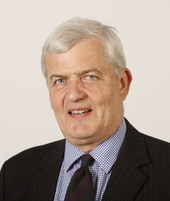
- Corry in 2016

Member of the Scottish Parliament for West Scotland (1 of 7 Regional MSPs)
- In office 5 May 2016 – 5 May 2021

Personal details
- Born: June 1950 (age 75) Helensburgh, Scotland
- Party: Scottish Conservative Party

Maurice Charles Steuart-Corry TD (born June 1950) is a Scottish Conservative Party politician. He was a Member of the Scottish Parliament (MSP) for the West Scotland region from the 2016 Scottish Parliament election until the 2021 election. He is currently the Provost of Argyll & Bute.

== Career ==
=== Army career ===
Corry joined the British Army in 1972 serving initially with the 51st Highland Volunteers part of the Territorial Army. Captain Corry was awarded the Efficiency Decoration in 1984, a first clasp to the medal in February 1994 and a second clasp in 1997 He was promoted to major in June 1984. Major Corry was transferred to the Black Watch in February 1995. He retired from the Royal Regiment of Scotland in September 2009.

=== Political career ===
Corry was elected to the Argyll and Bute council, representing Lomond North in 2012.

In 2016, Corry stood for the Scottish Parliament as the Conservative candidate for Dumbarton where he came third, then was elected from the West Scotland regional list. Corry sat on the Parliament's Public Petitions Committee. After his election to the Scottish Parliament he also continued in his position as a local councillor. He is the Conservative's spokesperson for veterans' affairs. In May 2016 in a Holyrood EU Referendum debate, Corry voted to back the case to leave the European Union. He later explained he had pressed the wrong button during the vote.

At the 2021 Scottish Parliament election, Corry contested the Dumbarton constituency, a Labour–SNP marginal where he came a distant third with 8.3% of the votes. He was placed eighth on the Conservative list for West Scotland, so he did not win one of the three list seats the party was entitled to. Corry's low placement on the list followed his omission from a list of endorsements by a vetting committee set up by Ruth Davidson, the leader of the Conservatives in the Scottish Parliament.

In the 2022 Council Election, he was returned once again to Argyll & Bute as a member for Lomond North, and was appointed Provost by the administration on 18 May 2022.

In the 2026 Scottish Parliament election, he was the candidate for Cunninghame South but came in fourth place.
