= Oban North and Lorn (ward) =

Electoral ward in Argyll and Bute, Scotland

Location of the ward

Oban North and Lorn is one of the eleven wards used to elect members of the Argyll and Bute Council. It elects four Councillors.

== Councillors ==
Election	Councillors			
2007	Elaine Robertson (Ind.)	Duncan MacIntyre (Ind.)	Neil MacKay (Liberal Democrats)	Donald MacDonald (SNP)
2012	Elaine Robertson (Ind.)	Duncan MacIntyre (Ind.)	Ian Angus McDonald (Ind.)	Louise-Ann Glenn Lee (SNP)
2017	Elaine Robertson (Ind.)	Kieron Green (Ind.)	Andrew Vennard (Conservative)	Julie McKenzie (SNP)
2022	Luna Martin (Green) (SNP since 2026)	Kieron Green (Ind.)	Andrew Vennard (Conservative)	Julie McKenzie (SNP)

== Election results ==
=== 2022 election ===
Oban North and Lorn − 4 seats
Party	Candidate	FPv%	Count						
Party	Candidate	FPv%	1	2	3	4	5	6	7
SNP	Julie McKenzie (incumbent)	30.6	1,254						
Conservative	Andrew Vennard (incumbent)	18.7	767	772	779	788	842		
Independent	Kieron Green (incumbent)	15.4	632	679	703	748	811	819	1,107
Independent	Linda Battison	11.4	466	490	519	571	631	637	
Green	Luna Martin	9.7	396	583	624	716	784	785	897
Liberal Democrats	Veronica Davis	6.5	267	290	305	318			
Independent	Kyle Campbell-Renton	4.8	198	223	245				
Alba	Angus Files	2.9	117	158					
Electorate: 8,369 Valid: 4,097 Spoilt: 33 Quota: 820 Turnout: 49.3%

=== 2017 election ===
2017 Argyll and Bute Council election

Oban North and Lorn - 4 seats
Party	Candidate	FPv%	Count							
Party	Candidate	FPv%	1	2	3	4	5	6	7	8
Independent	Elaine Robertson (incumbent)	22.01	913							
Conservative	Andrew Vennard	17.11	710	721.8	727.9	746.5	769.4	789.6	814.1	828.4
SNP	Julie McKenzie (incumbent)	16.63	690	694.6	698.6	704.8	717.1	754.8	829.2	1356.5
SNP	Breege Smyth	12.97	538	543.1	546.1	548.2	562.2	581.5	647.2	
Independent	Kieron Green (incumbent)	11.69	485	515.8	519.3	563.3	600.5	677.0	764.2	797.0
Green	William Mohieddeen	7.33	304	307.5	308.5	320.6	328.0	342.4		
Independent	Neil MacKay	4.39	182	189.5	210.3	222.4	262.5			
Independent	Grant Nicholson	3.71	154	159.2	166.7	177.0				
Independent	Brian Burnett	2.68	111	115.0	118.1					
Independent	Allan McKie	1.49	62	64.3						
Electorate: Valid: 4,149 Spoilt: 51 Quota: 830 Turnout: 4,200 (52.0%)

=== 2012 election ===
2012 Argyll and Bute Council election

Oban North and Lorn - 4 seats
Party	Candidate	FPv%	Count								
Party	Candidate	FPv%	1	2	3	4	5	6	7	8	9
Independent	Elaine Robertson (incumbent)	22.23%	807								
SNP	Louise Anne Glen-Lee††(incumbent)	19.47%	707	715.6	721.9	732					
Independent	Duncan MacIntyre (incumbent)††††††	11.59%	421	436.2	443.7	471.9	472.2	509.6	611.3	726.7	811.4
SNP	Donald Melville	11.29%	410	415.9	420	445.1	448.8	471	517.2	541.9	
Independent	Iain Angus MacDonald †††††	9.94%	361	372.7	379.9	410.8	411.1	437.8	476.8	542.6	645.3
Conservative	Roy Rutherford	9.14%	332	340.1	343.3	353.5	353.6	384.4	409.2		
Independent	Neil MacKay (incumbent)	6.11%	222	231.3	239	243.1	243.3	264.3			
Liberal Democrats	Gwyneth Neal	5.17%	188	196.7	201.1	206.3	206.5				
Independent	George Doyle	3.44%	125	126.9	136.1						
Independent	Wilma McIntosh	1.60%	58	61.3							
Electorate: 7,524 Valid: 3,631 Spoilt: 46 Quota: 727 Turnout: 3,677 (48.26%)

=== 2007 Election ===
2007 Argyll and Bute Council election

Oban North and Lorn
Party	Candidate	FPv%	%	Seat	Count
Independent	Elaine Robertson	1,005	22.0	1	1
Independent	Duncan MacIntyre	779	17.1	2	5
Liberal Democrats	Neil MacKay†††	665	14.6	3	8
SNP	Donald MacDonald	618	13.6	4	10
SNP	Mike MacKenzie	401	8.8		
Conservative	Eileen Mary Kirkpatrick	387	8.5		
Independent	Ian Smyth	200	4.4		
Independent	Sidney MacDougall	188	4.1		
Independent	George Doyle	176	3.9		
Independent	Gwen Cameron	140	3.1		
