= Argyll and Bute Council =

Scottish unitary authority council in Argyll and Bute, Scotland

Argyll and Bute Comhairle Earra Ghàidheal is Bhòid
- Coat of arms

- Council logo

Leadership
- Provost: Jan Brown, Scottish National Party since 23 September 2026
- Leader: Jim Lynch, Scottish National Party since 4 April 2024
- Chief Executive: Pippa Milne since January 2020

Structure
- Seats: 36 councillors
- Graph of the party split among 36 seats.
- Political groups: Administration (21) SNP (12) Liberal Democrats (4) Labour (1) Independent (4) Other parties (14) Conservative (5) Reform (2) Labour (1) Independent (6) Vacancy (1) Vacant (1)

Elections
- Voting system: Single transferable vote
- Last election: 6 May 2022
- Next election: 6 May 2027

Meeting place
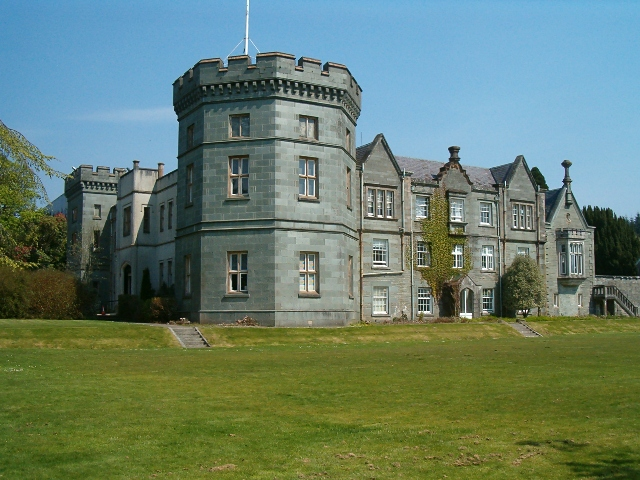
- Kilmory Castle, Lochgilphead, PA31 8RT

Website
- www.argyll-bute.gov.uk

Argyll and Bute Council (Scottish Gaelic: Comhairle Earra Ghàidheal is Bhòid) is one of the 32 local authorities of Scotland, covering the Argyll and Bute council area.

Thirty-six representative members make up the council, elected, since 2007, by single transferable vote and, before that, by the first-past-the-post system. The council has been under no overall control since 2007. In 2024 a coalition of the Scottish National Party, Liberal Democrats, Labour, Scottish Greens and some of the independent councillors took control of the council. It is based at Kilmory Castle at Lochgilphead. The council has been a member of the Islands Forum since 2022.

== Political control ==
The council has been under no overall control since 2007. Following the 2017 election a coalition of the Conservatives, Liberal Democrats and some of the independent councillors took control of the council. The same coalition continued following the 2022 election, but was replaced in 2024 by an SNP-led coalition.

The first election to Argyll and Bute District Council was held in 1974, initially operating as a shadow authority alongside the outgoing authorities until the new system came into force on 16 May 1975. A shadow authority was again elected in 1995 ahead of the change to council areas which came into force on 1 April 1996. Political control of Argyll and Bute since 1975 has been as follows:

Argyll and Bute District Council

Party in control	Years
Independent	1975–1996

Argyll and Bute Council

Party in control	Years
Independent	1996–2007
No overall control	2007–

=== Leadership ===
The role of provost is largely ceremonial in Argyll and Bute. They chair full council meetings and act as the council's civic figurehead. Political leadership is provided by the leader of the council. The leaders since 1996 have been:

Councillor	Party	From	To
Dick Walsh	Independent	1 Apr 1996	May 1999
Alison Hay	Liberal Democrats	13 May 1999	22 Mar 2001
Allan Macaskill	Independent	22 Mar 2001	May 2007
Dick Walsh	Independent	17 May 2007	May 2012
Roddy McCuish	SNP	22 May 2012	14 Feb 2013
James Robb	SNP	14 Feb 2013	13 May 2013
Roddy McCuish	Independent	23 May 2013	26 Sep 2013
Dick Walsh	Independent	26 Sep 2013	May 2017
Aileen Morton	Liberal Democrats	18 May 2017	Sep 2020
Robin Currie	Liberal Democrats	24 Sep 2020	4 Apr 2024
Jim Lynch	SNP	4 Apr 2024	

=== Composition ===
Following the 2022 election and subsequent by-elections and changes of allegiance up to September 2026, the composition of the council was:

Party	Seats
SNP	12
Conservative	5
Liberal Democrats	4
Labour	2
Reform	2
Independent	10
Vacant	1
Total	36

The council is run by the 'Administration Partnership', which comprises the SNP, Liberal Democrats, one of the two Labour councillors, and four of the independent councillors. Another independent councillor is described as an "independent unionist" and sits in a group with the Conservatives. A by-election to fill the vacant seat is due in October 2026. The next full council election is due in 2027.

== Premises ==
The council is based at Kilmory Castle in Lochgilphead, which had been built as a large country house in the 1820s. It was bought in 1974 and converted to become the headquarters of the Argyll and Bute District Council.

== NeverSeconds ==
In June 2012, the council was criticised for banning a local primary student, Martha Payne (aged 9), from taking photographs of her school dinners for her online blog. The blog, NeverSeconds, had been praised by the celebrity chef, Jamie Oliver, had attracted over two million visits, and at the time of the ban had raised nearly £2,000 for a food charity. On the day the story broke, the blog had raised over £40,000. After an initial statement from the council defending the decision, the ban was subsequently overturned by council leader, Roddy McCuish. In November 2012 a book written by David Payne, Martha's father, revealed the background to the council's attempt to censor and bully a 9-year-old girl. The book reads: "My anger and frustration at Argyll and Bute Council was not being soothed by time. Thinly veiled attacks on our parenting on national radio and an abusive phonecall stood out as examples of a public body sick to the very top. Complaints via the proper procedures and through elected councillors had brought no visible changes. Far from being contrite, they seemed to take a pride in being untouchable."

== Elections ==
Since 2007 elections have been held every five years under the single transferable vote system, introduced by the Local Governance (Scotland) Act 2004. Election results since 1995 have been as follows:

Year	Seats	SNP	Conservative	Liberal Democrat	Labour	Green	Independent / Other	Notes
1995	33	4	3	3	2	0	21	
1999	36	5	4	6	1	0	20	New ward boundaries.
2003	36	3	3	8	0	0	22	
2007	36	10	3	7	0	0	16	New ward boundaries.
2012	36	13	4	4	0	0	15	
2017	36	11	9	6	0	0	10	
2022	36	12	10	5	1	1	7	

=== Wards ===
Map of the area's wards in use since 2007

Eleven multi-member wards were created for the 2007 election, replacing 36 single-member wards which had been in place since 1999 (adjusted up from 33 in the 1990s):

- South Kintyre (3 seats)
- Kintyre and the Islands (3 seats)
- Mid Argyll (3 seats)
- Oban South and the Isles (4 seats)
- Oban North and Lorn (4 seats)
- Cowal (3 seats)
- Dunoon (3 seats)
- Isle of Bute (3 seats)
- Lomond North (3 seats)
- Helensburgh Central (4 seats)
- Helensburgh and Lomond South (3 seats)
