= McIntosh (surname) =

M'Intosh, McIntosh, MacIntosh, Macintosh, or Mackintosh (Gaelic: Mac an Tòisich) is a Scottish surname, originating from the Clan Mackintosh. Mac an Tòisich means (son of) leader/chief.

Notable people with the surname include:

- Alan McIntosh (born 1939), Welsh footballer
- Alastair McIntosh (born 1955), Scottish writer, academic and activist
- Andrew Mackintosh (born 1960), actor in The Bill BBC series
- Andrew McIntosh (disambiguation), several people

- Andrew McIntosh, Baron McIntosh of Haringey (1933–2010), British Labour politician
- Andrew McIntosh (physicist) (born 1952), Professor of Thermodynamics and director of Truth in Science
- Andrew McIntosh (Australian politician) (born 1955)
- Andrew McIntosh (cricketer) (born 1980), from Papua New Guinea
- Andrew M. McIntosh, British academic psychiatrist

- Andrew McIntosh, Baron McIntosh of Haringey (1933–2010), British Labour politician
- Basil McIntosh, Bahamian politician
- Bradley McIntosh (born 1981), English-Jamaican singer with S Club 7
- Cameron Mackintosh (born 1946), British theatrical producer
- Carl W. McIntosh (1914–2009), American academic at Montana State University
- Charlach Mackintosh (1935–2019), British alpine skier
- Charles Macintosh (1766–1843), Scottish inventor
- Charles Henry Mackintosh (1820–1896), Irish preacher and Christian writer
- Charles Rennie Mackintosh (1868–1928), Scottish architect and designer
- Chris Mackintosh (1903–1974), international athlete and ski pioneer
- D. N. McIntosh (1822–1896), leader of Creek Confederate regiment in the U. S. Civil War
- David McIntosh (disambiguation), multiple people
- Donald McIntosh (1838–1876), Canadian-born officer in Custer's 7th Cavalry, killed at Little Big Horn
- Donald McIntosh (mathematician) (1868–1957), British mathematician
- Doug McIntosh (1945–2021), American basketball player
- Douglas Mackintosh (1931–2024), British alpine skier
- E. E. B. Mackintosh (1880–1957), Director of the Science Museum, London
- Erick McIntosh (born 1987), American football player
- Ewart Alan Mackintosh (1893–1917), lieutenant in the British army during the First World War and a war poet
- Ewen MacIntosh (1973–2024), British actor
- Gavin MacIntosh (born 1999), American actor and model
- Gordon McIntosh (1925–2019), Australian politician
- Hamish McIntosh (born 1984), Australian rules footballer
- Harold Mackintosh, 1st Viscount Mackintosh of Halifax (1891–1964), son of confectioner John Mackintosh
- Harold V. McIntosh (1929–2015), American physicist working in Mexico
- Henry Macintosh (1892–1918), Scottish Olympic athlete
- Hugh McIntosh (disambiguation), multiple people
- James Crosskill Mackintosh (1839–1924), Canadian banker, broker, and politician
- James M. McIntosh (1828–1862), Confederate Army general in the American Civil War
- Jennifer McIntosh (born 1991), Scottish female sports shooter and Olympian
- John MacIntosh (disambiguation), multiple people
- John Mackintosh (disambiguation), multiple people
- John McIntosh (disambiguation), multiple people
- Kate Macintosh (born 1937), Scottish architect
- Kathaleeya McIntosh (born 1972), Thai–Scottish–Chinese actress, model and TV personality
- Ken Macintosh (born 1962), Scottish politician
- Ken Mackintosh (1919–2005), English bandleader
- Ken McIntosh, New Zealand rugby league coach
- Kenneth Mackintosh (1875–1957), justice of the Washington Supreme Court
- Kenny McIntosh (born 2000), American football player
- Lachlan McIntosh (1725–1806), American Revolutionary War general and political leader
- Lonnie McIntosh (stage name Lonnie Mack) (1941–2016), American rock guitar pioneer
- Lorraine McIntosh (born 1964), Scottish singer with Deacon Blue
- Lucy Mackintosh (historian), New Zealand museum curator and historian
- Lucy Mackintosh (born 1956), co-owner of Lucy Mackintosh Contemporary Art Gallery, Lausanne, Switzerland
- Maggie McIntosh (born 1947), American politician from Maryland
- Malcolm McIntosh (disambiguation), several people

- Sir Malcolm McIntosh (public servant) (1945–2000), Australian scientist
- Sir Malcolm McIntosh (politician) (1888–1960), Australian politician
- Malcolm Mackintosh (1921–2011), intelligence analyst, Sovietologist
- Malcolm Beg Mackintosh, 10th of Mackintosh (died 1457), Scottish clan chief

- Marjorie McIntosh (historian) (born 1940), American historian of Great Britain
- Mary Susan McIntosh (1936–2013), British sociologist and feminist
- Murray McIntosh (born 1967), Canadian ice hockey defenceman
- Neil William George Macintosh, (1906–1977), Australian medical doctor and anthropologist, chair of the Council of the Australian Institute of Aboriginal and Torres Strait Islander Studies (AIATSIS) from 1966 to 1974
- Pat McIntosh, Scottish mystery writer
- Patricia McIntosh (born 1950), Trinidadian politician
- Pollyanna McIntosh (born 1979), Scottish actress, writer, and director
- R. J. McIntosh (born 1996), American football player
- Robert Mackintosh ('Red Rob', c. 1745–1807), Edinburgh music composer
- Robert Macintosh (1897–1989), first Nuffield Professor of Anaesthetics, Oxford
- Robert J. McIntosh (1922–2008), U.S. Representative from Michigan
- Ronald Alexander McIntosh (1904–1977), New Zealand journalist and astronomer
- Sandy McIntosh (born 1970), Canadian musician and architect, founder of Sonic Unyon Records.
- Samantha McIntosh, showjumper and equestrian from New Zealand
- Sarah MacIntosh (born 1969), British diplomat
- Sheena Mackintosh (1928–2018), British alpine skier
- Stephanie McIntosh (born 1985), Australian singer
- Summer McIntosh (born 2006), Canadian Olympic swimmer and world record holder
- Susan McIntosh, American anthropologist and archaeologist
- Sylvester McIntosh (1934–2017), United States Virgin Islands musician
- Tammy MacIntosh (born 1970), Australian actress
- Tim McIntosh (baseball), American baseball player
- Tim McIntosh (cricketer), a New Zealand cricketer
- Thomas McIntosh (footballer) Scottish footballer
- Troy McIntosh, (born 1973), Bahamian runner
- Trudy McIntosh (born 1984), Australian artistic gymnast
- Vora Mackintosh (1929–1998), British alpine skier
- Wallace McIntosh (1920–2007), British military aviator
- William M'Intosh (also spelt McIntosh) (1838–1931), Scottish physician and marine zoologist
- William McIntosh (1775–1825), Chief of the Lower Creek Indians
- William Priestly MacIntosh (1857–1930), Australian sculptor
- Willie McIntosh (actor) (born 1970), Thai–Scottish–Chinese actor, model and TV personality
- W. S. McIntosh (1921–1974), civil rights leader in Dayton, Ohio
- Winston Hubert McIntosh (1944–1987), better known as Peter Tosh, Jamaican reggae musician
