= McIntosh =

McIntosh may refer to:

- McIntosh (apple), an apple cultivar
- McIntosh Laboratory, an American manufacturer of high-end audio equipment
- McIntosh (surname)

== Places ==
In the United States

- McIntosh, Alabama, a town
- McIntosh, Florida, a town
- McIntosh, Georgia, an unincorporated community
- McIntosh, Missouri, an unincorporated community
- McIntosh, Minnesota, a city
- McIntosh, South Dakota, a city
- McIntosh, Washington, an unincorporated community
- McIntosh County (disambiguation)

In Canada

- McIntosh, Bruce County, Ontario, an unincorporated community
- McIntosh, Kenora District, Ontario, an unincorporated place

In outer space

- 5061 McIntosh, an asteroid

== Other uses ==
- Fort McIntosh (disambiguation), three former military installations in the United States
- McIntosh Reserve, an outdoor recreational area in Carroll County, Georgia
- McIntosh High School, Peachtree County, Georgia, United States

== See also ==
- Macintosh (disambiguation)
- Mackintosh (disambiguation)
