= Mackintosh =

Mackintosh (Gaelic: Mac an Tòisich) may refer to:

- Mackintosh (brand), a raincoat and jacket brand founded in 1824 in Scotland, now owned by Tokyo firm Yagi Tsusho
- Mackintosh (raincoat), a British form of raincoat
- Mackintosh's or John Mackintosh and Co., British confectionery company
  - Rowntree Mackintosh, following a 1969 merger
  - Mackintosh's Toffee, its namesake confectionery
- Viscount Mackintosh of Halifax, a title in the Peerage of the United Kingdom (also Baron Mackintosh of Halifax)
- Clan Mackintosh, a Scottish clan
- Mackintosh Braun an American electropop group from Portland, Oregon
- Mackintosh Dam, a concrete-faced rock-fill embankment dam across the Mackintosh River, located in Western Tasmania, Australia.
- Mackintosh gallery
- Mackintosh School of Architecture, one of the five schools which make up the Glasgow School of Art,
- Mackintosh River, a major perennial river located in the West Coast region of Tasmania, Australia.
- Delfont Mackintosh Theatres, a theatre group owned by British theatrical producer Cameron Mackintosh
- The Mackintosh Man, a 1973 Cold War spy film directed by John Huston
- Mackintosh and T.J., a 1975 American modern day Western film starring Roy Rogers

== People ==
- Aeneas Mackintosh
- Andrew Mackintosh
- Archibald Mackintosh
- Cameron Mackintosh
- Charles Henry Mackintosh
- Charles Rennie Mackintosh
- Chris Mackintosh
- C.J. Mackintosh
- Clare Mackintosh
- David Mackintosh
- Ebenezer Mackintosh
- Eva Mackintosh
- Ferquhard Mackintosh, 12th of Mackintosh
- Gregor Mackintosh
- Harold Mackintosh, 1st Viscount Mackintosh of Halifax
- Ian Mackintosh
- Iain Mackintosh
- Jamie Mackintosh
- James Mackintosh
- John Mackintosh
- Ken Mackintosh
- Lachlan Beg Mackintosh, 14th of Mackintosh
- Laird Mackintosh
- Lucy Mackintosh
- Mackintosh baronets of Mackintosh (1812)
- Malcolm Mackintosh
- Malcolm Beg Mackintosh, 10th of Mackintosh
- Margaret Macdonald Mackintosh
- Martha Mackintosh
- Nicholas Mackintosh
- Sheena Mackintosh
- Sophie Mackintosh
- Steven Mackintosh
- Stuart MacKintosh
- Stuart P. M. Mackintosh
- Tim Mackintosh-Smith
- Tom Mackintosh
- Tom Mackintosh (cricketer)
- Vora Mackintosh
- William Mackintosh (engineer)
- William Mackintosh, 13th of Mackintosh

== See also ==
- McIntosh (disambiguation)
- Macintosh (disambiguation)
- Charles Mackintosh (disambiguation)
- John Mackintosh (disambiguation)
- Lucy Mackintosh (disambiguation)
- William Mackintosh (disambiguation)
