= List of U.S. counties named after prominent Confederate historical figures =

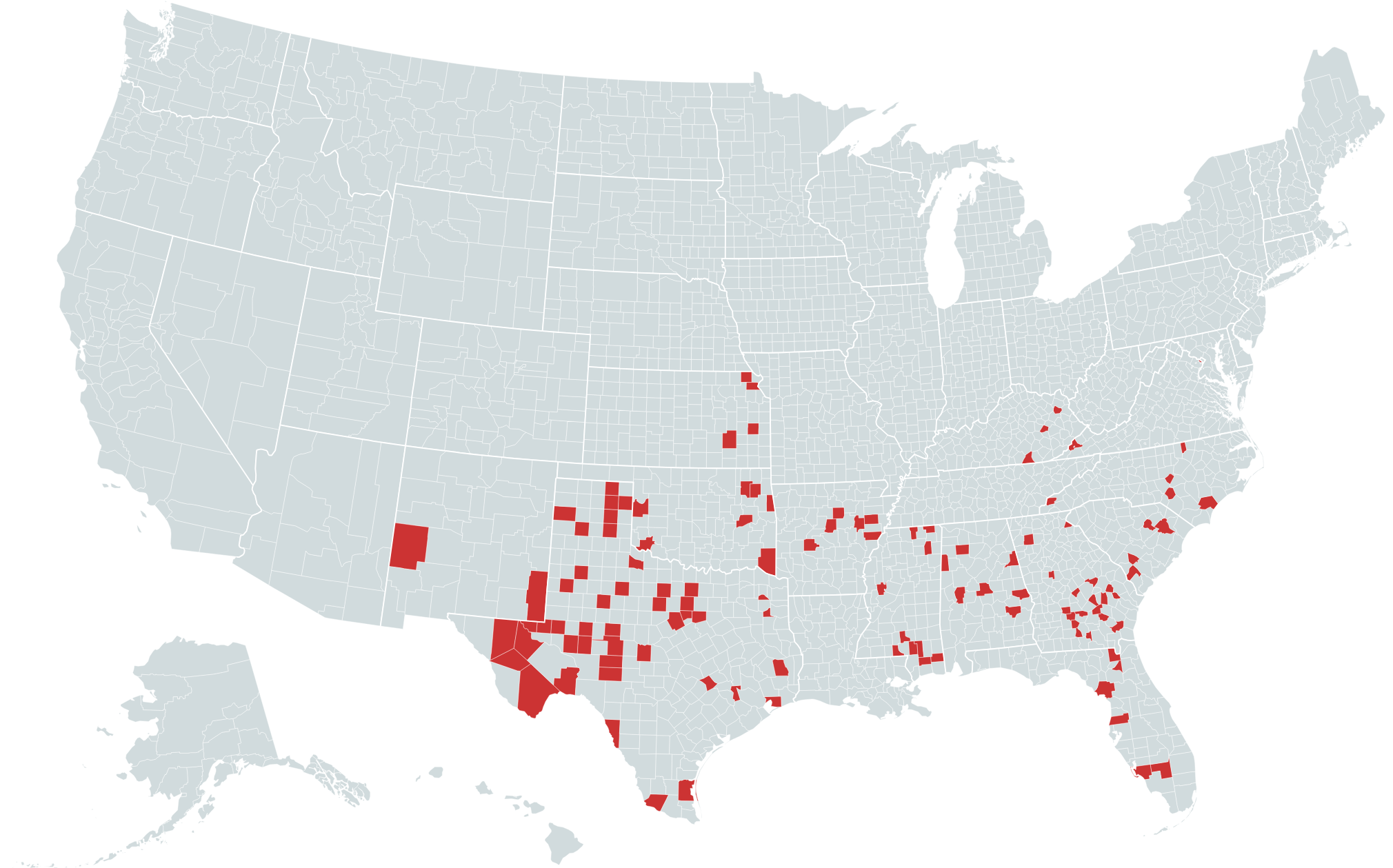
Map of the counties named after prominent Confederate historical figures tabulated below.

This is a list of U.S. counties named after prominent Confederate historical figures. The counties are named primarily for Confederate politicians and military officers. Most counties are located in former Confederate States, but seven counties are located in what was the Indian Territory (present-day Oklahoma), a territory that was aligned and controlled by the Confederacy. Four further counties are in the border states (three in Kentucky and one in Missouri). Four counties are located in a Union State (Kansas), and two further counties are in New Mexico, which consisted of two territories, one of which was controlled by the Union and one by the Confederacy until the Union gained control of both. Though Tennessee, a former Confederate state, has no counties directly named after any Confederate leaders, it has some counties named after relatives of some Confederate leaders, some of which have the same last name, such as Cheatham County, Tennessee. There are 120 counties in total.

The most common Confederacy-related county names are "Lee County" (for Robert E. Lee), with eight examples, and "Jeff Davis County" or "Jefferson Davis County" (for Jefferson Davis), with four examples. Lucius Quintus Cincinnatus Lamar has three counties named after him, and David Rice Atchison, Patrick Cleburne, Alexander Stephens, and Henry A. Wise have two counties each named after them. There are also two "Johnson County" examples, but one of them, in rural Southeast Georgia, is named for Herschel V. Johnson and the other, in the Dallas–Fort Worth metroplex is named for Col. Middleton Tate Johnson Sr. Some counties are named after individuals who were closely related to Confederate leaders such as Hardeman County, Tennessee (named after Thomas J. Hardeman, the father of Confederate brigadier general William Polk Hardeman) and Lee County, Virginia (named after Henry Lee III, the father of Confederate general-in-chief Robert E. Lee).

== Table ==
Place name	State	Named after
Adair County	Oklahoma	Colonel William Penn Adair of the First Regiment of Cherokee Mounted Rifles, Cherokee Nation delegate
Alcorn County	Mississippi	James L. Alcorn, Confederate brigadier general and Governor of Mississippi
Allen Parish	Louisiana	Henry Watkins Allen, Confederate brigadier general and Governor of Louisiana
Anderson County	Kansas	Joseph C. Anderson, member of a secret militant group "Southern League" which smuggled weapons south to the Confederacy, also famous for refusing to take an oath of allegiance to the Union, Border Ruffian, Speaker pro Tempore of the Kansas Territorial Legislature
Arlington County	Virginia	Named in honor of Arlington House, the home of General Robert E. Lee, originally named after Arlington Archeological Site where the family originated
Atchison County	Kansas	David Rice Atchison, Confederate brigadier general of the Missouri Home Guard, U.S Senator and President pro tempore of the United States Senate
Atchison County	Missouri	David Rice Atchison, Confederate brigadier general of the Missouri Home Guard, U.S Senator and President pro tempore of the United States Senate
Bacon County	Georgia	Confederate soldier Augustus Octavius Bacon, speaker of the Georgia House of Representatives
Baker County	Florida	Confederate Senator James McNair Baker
Bamberg County	South Carolina	General Francis Marion Bamberg
Bartow County	Georgia	Colonel Francis S. Bartow, killed at the First Battle of Manassas, the first brigade commander of the Confederate States Army to die in combat
Beauregard Parish	Louisiana	General P.G.T. Beauregard, one of the designers of the Confederate Battle Flag
Ben Hill County	Georgia	Benjamin Harvey Hill, member of the Confederate Senate, U.S Representative and U.S. Senator
Benton County	Mississippi	Brigadier General Samuel Benton, 34th Mississippi Infantry Regiment, mustered from the same counties from which Benton County was formed in 1870
Bleckley County	Georgia	Confederate soldier Logan Edwin Bleckley, Chief Justice of the Georgia Supreme Court
Bradford County	Florida	Captain Richard Bradford, killed in the Battle of Santa Rosa Island, the first Confederate officer from Florida to die in the American Civil War
Brantley County	Georgia	Confederate soldier Benjamin Daniel Brantley, Georgia state representative
Brewster County	Texas	Colonel Henry Percy Brewster
Brown County	Kansas	Albert G. Brown, member of the Confederate Senate, U.S Representative, U.S. Senator and Governor of Mississippi
Bullock County	Alabama	Colonel Edward Bullock
Camp County	Texas	Colonel John Lafayette Camp, Texas state senator
Candler County	Georgia	First Lieutenant Allen Daniel Candler, U.S Representative, Georgia Secretary of State and Georgia Governor
Catron County	New Mexico	First Lieutenant Thomas B. Catron, U.S Representative, U.S Senator and Mayor of Santa Fe
Chambers County	Texas	Confederate soldier Thomas Jefferson Chambers, Texas state representative
Chilton County	Alabama	William Parish Chilton, Alabama Supreme Court Justice and Confederate congressman
Cleburne County	Alabama	Major General Patrick Cleburne
Cleburne County	Arkansas	Major General Patrick Cleburne
Coke County	Texas	Captain Richard Coke, U.S Senator and Governor of Texas
Cook County	Georgia	General Philip Cook, U.S. Representative
Crisp County	Georgia	Confederate soldier Charles Frederick Crisp, Speaker of the United States House of Representatives
Cross County	Arkansas	Confederate soldier David C. Cross, local politician
Culberson County	Texas	Lieutenant Colonel David B. Culberson, U.S Representative
Donley County	Texas	Confederate Soldier Stockton P. Donley and associate justice of the Supreme Court of Texas
Ector County	Texas	Brigadier General Mathew D. Ector
Elliott County	Kentucky	Congress of the Confederate States Representative John Milton Elliott, helped organised the Confederate government of Kentucky, U.S Representative
Erath County	Texas	Major George Bernard Erath, raised a company of the Fifteenth Texas Infantry regiment, Texas state representative and Texas state senator
Evans County	Georgia	Brigadier General Clement A. Evans, notably commanded infantry in the Eastern Theater of the American Civil War, later edited a 12-volume work on Confederate military history, so named, in 1899 and was president of the United Confederate Veterans
Faulkner County	Arkansas	Captain Sandford C. Faulkner, composer and fiddler known for the "Arkansas Traveler"
Florence County	South Carolina	Named for its county seat Florence, founded by General William Harllee, president of the Wilmington & Manchester Railroad and South Carolina Lieutenant Governor, who in turn named the town after his daughter Florence Harlee (as Harleesville already existed)
Foard County	Texas	Major Robert L. Foard
Forrest County	Mississippi	General Nathan Bedford Forrest
Garland County	Arkansas	Augustus Hill Garland, member of the Confederate Senate, U.S. Senator, United States Attorney General and Governor of Arkansas
George County	Mississippi	Colonel James Z. George, Chief Justice of the Mississippi Supreme Court and U.S Senator
Glasscock County	Texas	Confederate soldier George Washington Glasscock, Texas state representative
Graham County	North Carolina	William Alexander Graham, member of the Confederate Senate, U.S. Senator, United States Secretary of the Navy and Governor of North Carolina
Gray County	Texas	Peter W. Gray, member of the Confederate House of Representatives for the Houston district
Gregg County	Texas	Brigadier General John B. Gregg
Greenwood County	Kansas	Congress of the Confederate States Representative Alfred B. Greenwood, Commissioner of Indian Affairs, U.S Representative
Hale County	Alabama	Lieutenant Colonel Stephen F. Hale
Hampton County	South Carolina	Lieutenant General Wade Hampton III, cavalry leader and later governor of South Carolina
Hemphill County	Texas	Congress of the Confederate States Representative John Hemphill, U.S Senator
Hendry County	Florida	Captain Francis A. Hendry, local politician
Hoke County	North Carolina	General Robert Hoke
Hood County	Texas	Lieutenant General John Bell Hood, commander of Hood's Texas Brigade
Humphreys County	Mississippi	Benjamin G. Humphreys, Confederate brigadier general and Governor of Mississippi
Jackson County	Oklahoma	Lieutenant General Thomas Jonathan "Stonewall" Jackson
Jeff Davis County	Georgia	Jefferson Davis, President of the Confederacy
Jeff Davis County	Texas	Jefferson Davis, President of the Confederacy
Jefferson Davis County	Mississippi	Jefferson Davis, President of the Confederacy
Jefferson Davis Parish	Louisiana	Jefferson Davis, President of the Confederacy
Johnson County	Georgia	Herschel V. Johnson, member of the Confederate Senate, U.S vice-presidential candidate in the 1860 United States presidential election, U.S. Senator and Governor of Georgia
Johnson County	Texas	Colonel Middleton Tate Johnson Sr.
Kenedy County	Texas	Mifflin Kenedy, known for successfully transporting cotton and other goods for the Confederacy along the Rio Grande river to avoid the Union blockade and allow exports from the Confederacy to Europe
Lamar County	Alabama	Colonel Lucius Quintus Cincinnatus Lamar, U.S Representative, U.S Senator, United States Secretary of the Interior and Associate Justice of the Supreme Court of the United States
Lamar County	Georgia	Colonel Lucius Quintus Cincinnatus Lamar, U.S Representative, U.S Senator, United States Secretary of the Interior and Associate Justice of the Supreme Court of the United States
Lamar County	Mississippi	Colonel Lucius Quintus Cincinnatus Lamar, U.S Representative, U.S Senator, United States Secretary of the Interior and Associate Justice of the Supreme Court of the United States
Lanier County	Georgia	Confederate soldier Sidney Lanier, poet, musician and academic often known as the "poet of the Confederacy"
Lea County	New Mexico	Confederate soldier and guerilla leader Joseph C. Lea, considered the "father of Roswell"
Lee County	Alabama	General Robert E. Lee
Lee County	Arkansas	General Robert E. Lee
Lee County	Florida	General Robert E. Lee
Lee County	Kentucky	General Robert E. Lee
Lee County	Mississippi	General Robert E. Lee
Lee County	North Carolina	General Robert E. Lee
Lee County	South Carolina	General Robert E. Lee
Lee County	Texas	General Robert E. Lee
Levy County	Florida	David Levy Yulee, U.S Representative and U.S Senator who resigned to support the Confederacy, Confederate congressman (according to some sources) and notably arrested and imprisoned at Fort Pulaski for treason after aiding the 1865 escape of Confederate President Jefferson Davis
Loving County	Texas	Oliver Loving, known for being prevented from returning by the Union to Texas, before he successfully escaped and was commissioned by the Confederate States Army to produce beef and drive cattle along the Mississippi River; the Confederate Government later owed him between $100,000 and $250,000
Lubbock County	Texas	Colonel Thomas Saltus Lubbock
Maverick County	Texas	Samuel Augustus Maverick, Confederate diplomat (negotiating the peaceful surrender of Union-aligned federal garrisons from Texas) and one of three commissioners appointed by the Texas Secession Convention
Mayes County	Oklahoma	Confederate soldier Samuel Houston Mayes of the Second Regiment of Cherokee Mounted Rifles, Principal Chief of the Cherokee Nation
McCreary County	Kentucky	Lieutenant Colonel James B. McCreary, U.S Representative, U.S Senator and Governor of Kentucky
McCulloch County	Texas	Brigadier General Benjamin McCulloch
McCurtain County	Oklahoma	Lieutenant Colonel Jackson McCurtain and 2nd Lieutenant Edmund McCurtain of the First Regiment of Choctaw and Chickasaw Mounted Rifles, both later Principal Chiefs of the Choctaw Nation
McIntosh County	Oklahoma	Colonels D. N. McIntosh and Chilly McIntosh of the Muscogee McIntosh family
Ochiltree County	Texas	Colonel William Beck Ochiltree, 18th Texas Infantry, a prominent figure in the Republic of Texas
Oldham County	Texas	William Simpson Oldham Sr., pioneer Texas lawyer and Confederate Senator
Parker County	Texas	Confederate Soldier Isaac Parker, Texas state representative and Texas state senator
Pasco County	Florida	Samuel Pasco, Confederate soldier and later U.S. Senator
Pender County	North Carolina	William Dorsey Pender, Confederate soldier mortally wounded at the Battle of Gettysburg
Randall County	Texas	Brigadier General Horace Randal
Reeves County	Texas	Colonel George R. Reeves
Reagan County	Texas	John Henninger Reagan, postmaster general of the Confederacy
Roberts County	Texas	Colonel Oran Milo Roberts, president of the Texas secession convention, Chief Justice of the Texas Supreme Court and Governor of Texas
Roger Mills County	Oklahoma	Colonel Roger Q. Mills, U.S Representative and U.S. Senator
Rogers County	Oklahoma	Confederate Soldier Clement Vann Rogers of the First Regiment of Cherokee Mounted Rifles, Cherokee judge, member of the Cherokee Senate and delegate to the Oklahoma Constitutional Convention
Schleicher County	Texas	Captain Gustav Schleicher, U.S Representative
Scurry County	Texas	General William Read Scurry
Starr County	Texas	James Harper Starr, director of the postal service of the Trans-Mississippi Department
Stephens County	Georgia	Alexander Stephens, vice president of the Confederacy
Stephens County	Texas	Alexander Stephens, vice president of the Confederacy
Stone County	Mississippi	Colonel John Marshall Stone, Governor of Mississippi
Stonewall County	Texas	Lieutenant General Thomas Jonathan "Stonewall" Jackson
Sutton County	Texas	Colonel John S. Sutton
Terrell County	Texas	Brigadier General Alexander Watkins Terrell, Terrell's Texas Cavalry Regiment
Tift County	Georgia	Captain Nelson Tift of the Confederate States Navy, U.S Representative and founder of Albany, Georgia
Terry County	Texas	Colonel Benjamin Franklin Terry, Terry's Texas Rangers
Tom Green County	Texas	Brigadier General Thomas Green
Toombs County	Georgia	General Robert Toombs, Secretary of State of the Confederacy
Turner County	Georgia	Captain Henry G. Turner, associate justice of the Supreme Court of Georgia and U.S Representative
Tyler County	Texas	John Tyler, President of the United States, Confederate congressman, also noted for presiding over the Virginia Secession Convention and signing the Virginia Ordinance of Secession
Upton County	Texas	Generals John C. and William F. Upton
Vance County	North Carolina	Colonel Zebulon Baird Vance, twice governor of North Carolina
Waller County	Texas	Edward Leonard Waller, delegate for Austin County at the Secession Convention, in the convention Waller supported Texas joining the Confederacy, and co-signed (as the only living signer of the Texas Deceleration of Independence) the Texas Ordinance of Secession, also approving the "Constitution of the Confederate States of America", Mayor of Austin
Walthall County	Mississippi	General Edward C. Walthall
Wheeler County	Georgia	Named for Joseph Wheeler, Confederate cavalry general, later joined the U.S. Army, serving in the Spanish–American War and Philippine–American War
Winkler County	Texas	Colonel Clinton McKamy Winkler
Winston County	Alabama	Colonel John A. Winston and Governor of Alabama
Wise County	Texas	General Henry A. Wise and Governor of Virginia
Wise County	Virginia	General Henry A. Wise and Governor of Virginia
Woodruff County	Arkansas	Confederate Soldier William E. Woodruff, the first Treasurer of Arkansas and founder of the state's first newspaper the Arkansas Gazette
Young County	Texas	Colonel William Cooke Young, 11th Texas Cavalry Regiment

== See also ==
- List of Confederate monuments and memorials which covers counties, cities and other inhabited places named for Confederate leaders
