= McIntosh Road =

Historic Native American trade route

McIntosh Road is a historic Native American route in the northern part of the U.S. states of Alabama and Georgia. It was named for the prominent Creek Indian chief William McIntosh, a leader of the Lower Towns who helped to improve it in the early 19th century.

== History ==
The original McIntosh Road in Alabama was called the "Georgia Road". It led from Kymulga Ferry near Childersburg, Alabama, to Talladega, Alabama, then extends northeasterly along the south side of the Choccolocco Creek valley and crosses the ridge containing Cheaha Mountain at a pass some miles north. It travels through the area of modern Hollis Crossroads and crosses the Tallapoosa River at an Okfuskee village, continuing in a southeasterly direction to the Chattahoochee River near modern Whitesburg, Georgia, in Carroll County.

The road in Alabama can be followed by U.S. Route 431 (US 431), Alabama State Route 21 (SR 21), Talladega County Route 180 (CR 180), and Talladega CR 240, paralleling the Norfolk Southern Railway tracks to the Kymulga Mill And Covered Bridge. The road was approximately 80 miles (130 km) north of the Federal Road. The Federal Road ran through Georgia from Washington, D.C., to New Orleans, Louisiana.

The road continues today along its original axis in Talladega and Calhoun counties in Alabama, and the original track virtually disappears as it enters the mountains of Cleburne County. The eastern terminus is at McIntosh's ferry, which he operated on the Chattahoochee River near his plantation, "Lochau" or "Lockchau Talofau", on Acorn Bluff.

The route is also called the McIntosh Trail. In the early 21st century, the McIntosh Trail Historic Preservation Society in Georgia worked to have the portion in Georgia designated as a scenic byway by the state department of transportation. The route begins at Indian Springs and travels through Coweta, Butts, Spalding, Fayette, and Carroll counties, and through downtown Newnan, Sharpsburg, and Senoia. By 2011, the 95.5-mile-long (153.7 km) route had gained preliminary approval.

== Usage ==
President Thomas Jefferson discussed the benefits of providing provisions and lodging for travelers with McIntosh during a meeting on November 2, 1805; McIntosh built a modest hotel along the road.

McIntosh Reserve Park in Carroll County, Georgia, preserves some of the McIntosh plantation and his burial site at the eastern end of McIntosh Road. McIntosh was executed at his plantation on April 30, 1825, by Law Defenders on the order of the Creek National Council for having signed the Treaty of Indian Springs in 1825. The treaty ceded much of the communal Creek lands in Georgia and Alabama to the United States.

In April 1865, during the last months of the American Civil War, Union regiments under General John T. Croxton used the route to invade Georgia.
