= Thomas McIntosh =

Thomas McIntosh may refer to:

- Thomas McIntosh (politician) (1921–2005), member of the Philadelphia City Council
- Thomas McIntosh (footballer), Scottish footballer
- Thomas H. McIntosh (1879–1935), secretary manager of Darlington, Middlesbrough and Everton football clubs
