= Andrew McIntosh =

Andrew McIntosh may refer to:

- Andrew McIntosh, Baron McIntosh of Haringey (1933–2010), British Labour politician
- Andrew McIntosh (physicist), British physicist
- Andrew McIntosh (Australian politician) (born 1955), Australian politician
- Andrew McIntosh (cricketer) (born 1980), Papua New Guinean cricketer
- Andrew M. McIntosh, British academic psychiatrist
