= Macintosh (disambiguation) =

Macintosh (renamed Mac in 1999) is a family of personal computers designed by Apple Inc.

Macintosh may also refer to:

== Macintosh computers ==
- Macintosh 128K, the first computer produced under the Macintosh line, originally known as Apple Macintosh
- History of the Macintosh, from 1984 to 1997, before its rebrand to "Mac"
- List of Mac models, a comprehensive list of all Macintosh models produced by Apple Inc.
  - Compact Macintosh, line of all-in-one Macintosh computers produced from 1984 to 1995
  - Macintosh II family, line of high-end Macintosh computers produced from 1987 to 1993
  - Macintosh LC family, line of entry-level Macintosh computers produced from 1990 to 1997
  - Macintosh Quadra, line of high-end Macintosh computers produced from 1991 to 1995
  - PowerBook, line of Macintosh laptop computers produced from 1991 to 2006
  - Power Macintosh, line of high-end Macintosh computers produced from 1994 to 2006
- Mac operating systems, operating systems developed for Macintosh computers
  - Classic Mac OS, the operating system used on Macintosh computers from 1984 to 2001
  - macOS, the NeXTSTEP-based operating system used on Macintosh computers since 2001
- "macintosh", an IANA registered character set name, referring to Mac OS Roman

== Other uses ==
- MacIntosh Forts, seven observation posts built in Hong Kong on the border with China between 1949 and 1953
- McIntosh (apple) (Malus domestica), an apple cultivar
- Macintosh (surname)
- Macintosh (raincoat)

== See also ==
- Mackintosh (disambiguation)
- McIntosh (disambiguation)
