= John McIntosh =

John or Jack McIntosh may refer to:

== Politics ==
- John McIntosh (reformer) (1796–1853), businessman and political figure in Upper Canada
- John McIntosh (Quebec politician) (1841–1904), member of the Legislative Assembly of Quebec and the Canadian House of Commons
- John Donald McIntosh (1850–?), politician in Manitoba, Canada
- John William McIntosh (c. 1870–1939), physician and politician in British Columbia, Canada
- John Charles McIntosh (1874–1940), lawyer and political figure in British Columbia
- John McIntosh (Australian politician) (1901–1971), New South Wales politician
- Jack McIntosh (politician) (1909–1988), member of the Canadian House of Commons from Saskatchewan

== Sports ==
- Jack McIntosh (English footballer) (1876–?), English football forward
- Jack McIntosh (Australian footballer) (1878–1944), Australian rules footballer for Melbourne
- John H. McIntosh (1879–1925), American college football coach
- Jack McIntosh, American high jumper at the 1929 USA Outdoor Track and Field Championships
- Ian McIntosh (footballer) (John McGregor McIntosh, 1933–2022), Scottish footballer, see List of Bury F.C. players (25–99 appearances)
- John McIntosh (footballer, born 1943), Australian rules footballer for Claremont and St Kilda
- Jack McIntosh (strongman) (born 1988), British strongman competitor

== Others ==
- John McIntosh (farmer) (1777–c. 1846), American-born Canadian farmer credited with discovering the McIntosh apple
- John Baillie McIntosh (1829–1888), Union Army general in the American Civil War
- John F. McIntosh (1846–1918), Scottish locomotive engineer
- John Cowe McIntosh (1892–1921), British-born Australian aviator
- John Stanton McIntosh (1923–2015), American physicist and dinosaur paleontologist
- John McIntosh (educator) (born 1946), British headmaster of the London Oratory School

== See also ==
- John Mackintosh (disambiguation)
