= Acorn Creek =

Stream in Carroll County, Georgia, United States

- Location within Georgia

Location
- County: Carroll County, Georgia

Physical characteristics
- Source
  - coordinates: 33.5126123°N 84.9388292°W
- Mouth
  - coordinates: 33.4528915°N 84.9735517°W
- Discharge
  - location: Chattahoochee River

Basin features
- cities: Whitesburg, Georgia; Acorn Town (extinct)

Acorn Creek is a stream in Carroll County in the U.S. state of Georgia, at an elevation of 666 feet (203 m) above mean sea level. It is a tributary to the Chattahoochee River with a discharge rate of 2.74 cfs.

== Etymology ==
Acorn Creek takes its name from Acorn Town, a Creek Indian settlement and plantation which stood near its mouth. The original Muskogee name for this stream was Lakcv-hache. The plantation was home to Chief McIntosh of the Lower Creek indigenous peoples, and was known by various names: Acorn Town, Acorn Bluff, and Lochau Talofau.

== History ==
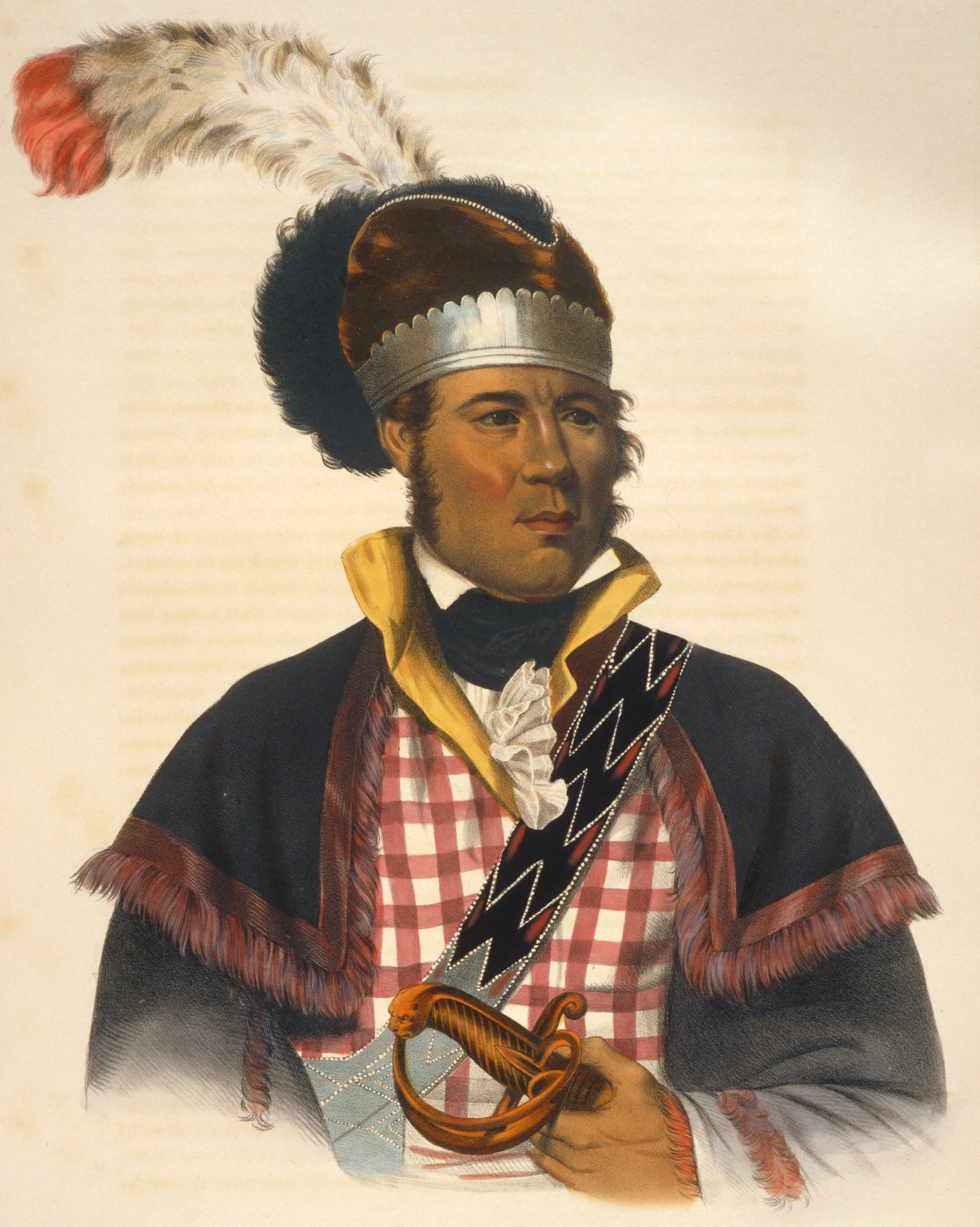
William McIntosh, 1838 by Charles Bird King

Acorn Creek today is located near the boundary of the McIntosh Reserve, a 527-acre (2.13 km^{2}) outdoor recreation area operated by the Carroll County Recreation Department. Carroll County acquired Lochau Talofau and established the Reserve in 1978. The Reserve contains a portion, but not all, of the larger 19th-century plantation of Acorn Bluff.

The Reserve is named for William McIntosh, a prominent Creek Indian leader and planter who maintained a home and plantation at the site. McIntosh named his plantation Lochau Talofau, which in English means Acorn Bluff (less frequently Acorn Town) and was one square mile in size, encompassing the lower reaches of Acorn Creek. At Acorn Bluff, McIntosh constructed a simple two-story log house which he used as both a residence and as an inn for travelers. A replica of the house was constructed after the purchase of the Reserve, and is open to park visitors.

McIntosh and the Lower Creek tribes sided with the United States government (against the British and their Red Stick Creek allies) in the Creek War of 1813–1814. McIntosh distinguished himself in the battles of Autossee and Horseshoe Bend, and was promoted to the rank of Brigadier-General. He again fought beside General Andrew Jackson in the First Seminole War of 1816-1819. A hero to many, McIntosh provoked the wrath of his fellow Creeks when he signed the second Treaty of Indian Springs, in 1825. The treaty essentially sold all Creek lands in Georgia and Alabama to the United States government. McIntosh was allowed to keep his plantation in exchange for signing the treaty. The sale of ancestral lands was opposed by the Creek National Council, which saw the act as both unauthorized and illegal. The Treaty of the Creek Agency (1818), which previously ceded two smaller portions of Creek lands, had moved the council to propose the execution of McIntosh. While McIntosh survived that earlier confrontation with the Creek National Council, the treaty of 1825 was his undoing. The Council ruled that McIntosh and other signatories had committed a capital offense against the Creek government and people by ceding communal lands, and ordered their execution. McIntosh was murdered at his home, Acorn Bluff, in 1825. McIntosh's grave is located in the McIntosh Reserve, adjacent to his reconstructed home. Georgia Historical Marker 022-3 (1984) marks the location of Brigadier-General McIntosh's home and burial site.

== Geology and watershed ==
The stream originates just west of the city of Whitesburg, Georgia and empties into the Chattahoochee River in Carroll County. The Acorn Creek-Chattahoochee River watershed has a total area of 28,284 acres. The Acorn Creek-Chattahoochee River watershed is part of the larger Middle Chattahoochee-Lake Harding watershed which has an area of 1,950,182 acres.

In Carroll County, where Acorn Creek flows into the path of the Chattahoochee river, the scar of the Brevard Fault is visible. The fault is a geologic feature that spans several states. From Atlanta to eastern Alabama, an area which includes Acorn Creek, the rock units that characterize the fault outcrop in widths rarely exceeding 600 feet (180 meters) yet extend along strike for 80 miles (130 km). The Chattahoochee, at McIntosh Reserve, becomes a shallow shoal. A guide to that area notes "The rugged landscape is evidence of the Brevard Fault zone, so prominent along [this] section of the river". The fault line is delineated where the banks of the Chattahoochee are "studded with huge boulders [which] rise 80 feet above the river". Within a few miles, downstream of Acorn Creek, the Brevard Fault leaves the Chattahoochee River and "continues in a south-westerly direction into Alabama".

McIntosh Reserve Park was closed for several months in 2009 and 2010, following the September 2009 flooding along the Chattahoochee River corridor and Acorn Creek. The park reopened Memorial Day weekend, 2010.

== Environmental assessment ==
An environmental assessment of the creek, performed in 1987-88 by the Georgia Department of Natural Resources - Environmental Protection Division (EPD) concluded that summer fecal coliform levels from both point and nonpoint pollution sources were within total maximum daily load target levels and no additional reductions were required.

The stream is a popular fishing location. One online fishing site lists Shoal bass as the most popular species of fish caught in Acorn Creek.
