= Rebecca Hawkins Hagerty =

- Born: Rebecca McIntosh; March 15, 1815
- Died: c. 1888
- Other name: Rebecca Hawkins Hagerty
- Citizenship: Muscogee Nation
- Known for: Enslaving people on Texas plantations
- Father: William McIntosh

Rebecca Hawkins Hagerty (née McIntosh; March 15, 1815 – c. 1888) was an American plantation owner and enslaver who, in 19th-century America, managed two plantations in Texas, enslaving over 100 people, with real and personal property values above $100,000, equivalent to $3 million in 2023, for more than a decade.

== Early life and marriages ==
Rebecca was born on March 15, 1815 to William McIntosh, the half Scottish and half Creek Chief of the Lower Creek Indian Nation, and Susannah Rowe, a Cherokee woman.

On April 30, 1825, Creek Indians murdered Rebecca's father for his involvement in creating the Treaty of Indian Springs, which ceded Indigenous lands in Georgia in exchange for territorial lands west of the Mississippi River.

Rebecca's blended family consisted of her parents, two step-mothers, and thirteen (half and whole) siblings. Her full-blood siblings included Delilah, Catherine Hettie, and Daniel Newnan (D. N.) McIntosh. Rebecca's paternal McIntosh and maternal Rowe pedigree placed her among the Five Civilized Tribes.

Rebecca and her McIntosh Family were part of the initial migrants removed westward from the Southern United States during the early 1830s to the Arkansas Territory (later Indian Territory, presently Oklahoma). While residing in the Indian Territory of the West, during March 1831, Rebecca married into the Hawkins Family when she wed her brother-in-law's brother Benjamin Hawkins—an Anglo-Creek man. Benjamin acquired wealth through the John Jacob Astor trading company; through domestic slave trading; and as a removal agent, brokering land deals between Native Americans and Anglo Americans. During the early 1830s while in Oklahoma, Rebecca and Benjamin started their family. Their first two children born while in the territory were William, who died young, and Louisa, who was born at Fort Gibson and reached maturity.

Coffle lines in tow, Rebecca, Benjamin, and their family moved into Nacogdoches (later Red River, presently Marion County, Texas, securing a league and labor of land (over 4,000 acres). Benjamin began selling the people he enslaved to his wife Rebecca as a legal precaution; by early 1838, she was purchasing land and enslaving people on her own. While in Nacogdoches, Rebecca's second daughter Anna was born between 1833 and 1835. In March 1836, offenders killed Benjamin because of his involvement in re-settling Native Americans into Texas, though Benjamin was allegedly in alliance with Sam Houston or Archibald Hotchkiss. Rebecca inherited land and chattel wealth from her father and husband Benjamin, and she continued purchasing land and enslaved people from her extended family, building her plantation-based business. During March 1838 in Texas, Rebecca married another land broker and enslaver, Spire M. Hagerty—an Anglo of Alabama. With Spire, Rebecca moved into Port Caddo, Shelby County (later Harrison County), Texas, where they jointly managed the Phoenix Planation, expanding crop production and enslavement. Rebecca had several children with Spire; three of whom died in infancy. Two children, Frances and Spire, Jr., lived to adulthood.

Rebecca and Spire's tumultuous marriage led to a divorce and they remained separated til Spire's untimely death. Rebecca expanded her plantation holdings by petitioning the courts to protect her daughters' inherited interest in their plantation operations. In one instance, Rebecca purchased controlling interest in the Marion County Refuge Plantation and sued Spire's executors in another court for possession and control of enslaved people on the Hagerty Estate of Harrison County. At the adjudication of Spire's will, Rebecca gained controlling interest in the Harrison County plantation and estate. Rebecca continued managing both the Phoenix Plantation and the Refuge Plantation, modeling affluent plantation owners such as Reese Huges, Willis Whitaker, Sr., and William Thomas Scott. The chief crop on both plantations was cotton, and they produced 500-600 bales of it annually, primarily for buyers in New Orleans. For over a decade, Rebecca operated the two plantations, increasing property values to over $100,000 and enslaving over 100 people; Rebecca became the wealthiest female and Native American slave owner in Texas.

== Career and Civil War era ==
The abolition of slavery in the United States depleted Rebecca's fortune and subsequent business ventures proved futile in replenishing her slavery-based wealth. During the war, Rebecca initially tried to negate her financial losses by selling beef and pork to the Jefferson, Texas Confederate Commissary. Partnering with her son-in-law, Samuel H. McFarland, this business venture failed. After the Emancipation Proclamation, Rebecca partnered with a local Jefferson, Texas merchant, Thomas B. Goyne, offering mortgage-backed lines of credit. Similarly, this venture was unsuccessful. During the Reconstruction era, Rebecca was unable to shift to railway transit of her cotton crops and cattle hides, when the U.S. Army Corps of Engineers cleared the Great Red River Raft, decreasing navigable waters around the vicinity of Jefferson and Marshall, Texas. Both the clearing of the river raft and the development of the railroad eventually impacted the population and property assessment, in the area.

== Death and legacy ==
Rebecca arranged a log cabin to be built in Oklahoma in 1866 to prepare for her return. Upon settlement in Oklahoma two decades later, Rebecca died circa 1888 while visiting her brother, Daniel Newnan McIntosh; some historical accounts claim she died earlier, in 1886 or 1887.

Rebecca reportedly outlived eleven of her thirteen siblings. She was also reportedly predeceased by all of her brothers-in-law and sons-in-law except one and six of her own eight children.

== Bibliography ==
- Bonner, James C. (1971). Georgia's Last Frontier. University of Georgia Press. ISBN 978-0-8203-0303-1.
- Bonner, James C. (1978). Milledgeville Georgia's Antebellum Capital. University of Georgia Press.
- Campbell, Randolph B. (1989). An Empire For Slavery The Peculiar Institution in Texas 1821-1865. Baton Rouge: Louisiana State University Press. pp. 202–203.
- Cawthon, Juanita Davis (1996). Some Early Citizens of Marion County Texas. p. 35.
- Cooner, Ben C. (January 1965). The Rise And Decline of Jefferson, Texas (B. A. thesis). North Texas State University.
- Corbin, Harriet Turner Porter (1967). A History And Genealogy of Chief William McIntosh, Jr. And His Known Descendants. California.
- Culbertson, Gilbert M. (Fall 1976). "The Creek Indians in East Texas". East Texas Historical Journal. 14 (2): 22.
- Debo, Angie (1941). The Road to Disappearance. Norman: University of Oklahoma Press.
- DuChateau, Andre Paul (Fall 1974). "The Creek Nation on The Eve of The Civil War". Chronicles of Oklahoma. 52 (3).
- Foreman, Carolyn Thomas (September 1943). "A Creek Pioneer". Chronicles of Oklahoma. 21 (3).
- Foreman, Grant (1936). Indians & Pioneers. Norman: University of Oklahoma Press.
- Foreman, Grant (1972). Indian Removal. Norman: University of Oklahoma Press.
- Hackney, V. H. Port Caddo A Vanished Village. Texas: The Marshall National Bank, 1966.
- Halliburton, Janet (Fall 1978). "Black Slavery in The Creek Nation". Chronicles of Oklahoma. 56 (3).
- Krauthamer, Barbara (November 2000). Blacks on The Borders: African-Americans' Transition From Slavery to Freedom in Texas And The Indian Territory, 1836-1907 (Thesis). Princeton University.
- Littlefield, Daniel F. Jr. (1979). Africans And Creeks. Connecticut: Greenwood Press.
- McArthur, Judith N. (October 1986). "Myth, Reality, And Anomaly: The Complex World of Rebecca Hagerty". East Texas Historical Journal. 24 (2).
- McKay, Arch, Mrs. and Mrs. H. A. Spelling. A History of Jefferson Marion County Texas 1836-1936, 2nd ed. Texas: no publisher listed, no year.
- McKelvey, Greta (2024). Regarding Rebecca. Texas.
- Meserve, John Bartlett (March 1932). "The MacIntoshes". Chronicles of Oklahoma. 10 (1).
- Mills, Gary B. (1978). Of Men & Rivers The Story of The Vicksburg District (Mississippi: U.S. Army Corps of Engineers, Vicksburg District. pp. 56–58.
- Nimmo, Sylvia, L. Weaver, McKnight, Hagerty, And Clute Families of Texas, Alabama, Georgia, Tennessee, And North Carolina. Oklahoma: Timbercreek Ltd., 1993.
- Porter, Kenneth Wiggins (Spring 1946). "The Hawkins' Negroes go to Mexico". Chronicles of Oklahoma. 24 (1).
- Siah, Lillie McIntosh (1994). Descendants of John McIntosh. Oklahoma.
- Thurman, Nita (August 25, 1974). "Rebecca Hagerty: A Legendary Pioneer". Marshall News Messenger.
- Tarpley, Fred. Jefferson: Riverport to The Southwest. Texas: Eakin Press, 1983.
- Savage, William W. Jr. (Spring 1976). "Creek Colonization in Oklahoma". Chronicles of Oklahoma. 54 (1): 39.
- Traylor, Russell. Carpetbaggers, Scalawags & Others. Texas: Texian Press, 1973.
- Woodward, Thomas S. (1859). Woodward's Reminiscences of The Creek And Muscogee Indians. Alabama: Barrett & Wimbish. p. 99.
- Wooster, Ralph A. "Notes on Texas' Largest Slaveholders, 1860." Southwestern Historical Quarterly vol. 65, no. 1 (July 1961).
- Wooster, Ralph A. "Wealthy Texans, 1860." Southwestern Historical Quarterly vol. 71, no. 2 (October 1967).
- Wright, J. Leitch Jr. (1986). Creeks And Seminoles. Lincoln, Nebraska: University of Nebraska Press.
