= Centre for Science Education =

Center or Centre for Science Education may refer to

- Challenger Center for Space Science Education
- National Center for Science Education, Oakland, California
- Wright Center for Science Education, Tufts University
- British Centre for Science Education
- Homi Bhabha Centre for Science Education, Mumbai, India
- Centre for Science Education, a research and business development unit of Sheffield Hallam University
- Centre for Science Education and Communication, a unit of the University of Delhi
