= Truth in Science =

United Kingdom-based creationist organisation

Truth in Science is a United Kingdom-based creationist organisation which promotes the Discovery Institute's "Teach the Controversy" campaign, which it uses to try to get the pseudoscientific concept of intelligent design creationism taught alongside evolution in school science lessons. The organisation claims that there is scientific controversy about the validity of Darwinian evolution, a view rejected by the United Kingdom's Royal Society and over 50 Academies of Science around the world. The group is affiliated with the Discovery Institute, the hub of the intelligent design movement, following its strategy and circulating the institute's promotional materials.

It should not be confused with a United States organisation, The Center for Truth in Science, which was founded in 2020 to dispute various legal/scientific issues which had been flooding the nation's judicial system, such as talc-based powders blamed for causing cancer, Roundup herbicide causing health effects, and various plastic products impacting the environment.

== Organisation ==
According to their website, the organisation has three subordinate groups, whose roster (as of February 2022) consisted of:

=== Board of directors ===
- Stephen A. Hyde (Chairman)
- Professor Andy McIntosh, Professor of Thermodynamics at the University of Leeds, a Christian and creationist.
- Phillip Metcalfe (Vice Chairman), a Christian publisher.
- John Perfect, a teacher.
- Maurice Roberts, Minister of the Free Church of Scotland (Continuing) and former teacher of classics.
- Steve Taylor, Professor of Electromagnetics and Physical Electronics

=== Council of Reference ===
- Stuart Burgess, Professor of Engineering Design at Bristol University, has a Diploma in Theology from the London Reformed Baptist Seminary (of the Metropolitan Tabernacle), and is a creationist.
- George Curry, Minister of Elswick Parish Church (St Stephen and St Paul), Newcastle upon Tyne.
- Dr Russell Healey, teacher of mathematics.
- Derek Linkens, Professor and Dean Emeritus, Department of Automatic Control and Systems Engineering, University of Sheffield.
- John MacArthur, Pastor of Grace Community Church in Sun Valley, California
- Albert N. Martin, Pastor Of Trinity Baptist Church, in Montville, New Jersey

=== Scientific Panel ===
- Geoff Barnard
- Nick Cowan, retired chemistry teacher.
- Paul Garner, lecturer and researcher with Biblical Creation Ministries.
- Tim Wells, Senior Lecturer in Neuroendocrinology at Cardiff University.

== Critics ==
The majority of scientists do not consider the conclusions of intelligent design to be scientific. The National Science Teachers Association and others have termed intelligent design a pseudoscience, and some have termed it junk science. Little scientific evidence in support of the intelligent design hypothesis has been published in peer-reviewed scientific journals and intelligent design has never produced a single scientifically testable theory.

=== Information pack ===
In September 2006, Truth in Science sent resource packs on intelligent design to the heads of science of all United Kingdom secondary schools. According to New Scientist, 59 schools around the United Kingdom used, or planned to use the Truth in Science information packs. The New Scientist article stated that Truth in Science circulated the material with the intention of countering the teaching of evolution in science classes, and that the information packs "promote the notion that life on Earth was created through intelligent design, a euphemism for the biblical story of creation".

The BBC News website reported the reaction to the information packs from the United Kingdom Department for Education and Skills: "Neither creationism nor intelligent design are taught as a subject in schools, and are not specified in the science curriculum. The national curriculum for science clearly sets down that pupils should be taught that the fossil record is evidence for evolution, and how variation and selection may lead to evolution or extinction." -- DfES Spokesperson, BBC News.

Speaking in the House of Commons, on 1 November 2006, The Right Hon. Jim Knight, Labour MP for Dorset South, and Minister of State at the Department for Education and Skills, the Minister for Schools, criticised Truth In Science, their information packs, and intelligent design creationism, citing them as unsuitable for the United Kingdom science curriculum. In answer to a question regarding what the Secretary of State for Education and Skills would do in response to the information packs, Knight said:

"Neither intelligent design nor creationism are recognised scientific theories and they are not included in the science curriculum, the Truth in Science information pack is therefore not an appropriate resource to support the science curriculum. The national curriculum for science clearly sets down that pupils should be taught: how uncertainties in scientific knowledge and scientific ideas change over time; the role of the scientific community in validating these changes; variation within species can lead to evolutionary changes; and, similarities and differences between species can be measured and classified," -- Jim Knight [holding answer 18 October 2006] 1 November 2006 : Column 456W

== Criticism ==
=== Religious ===
In December 2006, Colin Slee, the Dean of Southwark, said: "Everything needs to be explored, so that children can ask sensible questions. Though I see no huge difficulty with exploring intelligent design or creationism or flat Earth, they happen to be misguided, foolish and flying in the face of all evidence. I see no problem with Darwinian theory and Christian faith going hand in hand", -- Colin Slee, Dean of Southwark, The Times, December 2006.

Ekklesia, a United Kingdom theological think-tank, accused Truth in Science and the advocates of intelligent design of misrepresenting the bible, and that creationism and intelligent design are not on par with accepted scientific theories. According to one Ekklesia contributor, Geologist and Anglican vicar Michael Roberts, the material on the Truth in Science website is carefully packaged to hide its young Earth creationist roots. Simon Barrow, Ekklesia's co-director, outlined his critique of intelligent design creationism, and pseudo-scientific explanations for the universe: "Creationism and ID are in no way comparable to scientific theories of origins and have no place in the modern science classroom. They also distort mature Christian understandings of the universe as coming into being through the whole world process, not through reversals or denials of that process. The roots of creationism, whether in its ‘hard’ form, or in attenuated ID ideas, lie not in science but in misinterpretations of the Bible. Claims that such notions can be justified from a ‘literal’ reading of Genesis are nonsensensical. This book has not one, but two ‘creation stories’. They differ widely in detail, are highly figurative, and were written to combat fatalistic Ancient Near East cosmogonies by stressing the underlying goodness of the world as a gift of God, not to comment on modern scientific matters" -- Ekklesia, 25 September 2006.

=== Secular ===
In response to the introduction of intelligent design to European schools, the Royal Society stated that "intelligent design has far more in common with a religious belief in creationism than it has with science" and raised concerns that "young people are poorly served by deliberate attempts to withhold, distort or misrepresent scientific knowledge and understanding in order to promote particular religious beliefs". In a Guardian newspaper article, dated 27 November 2006, Professor Lewis Wolpert of University College London, attacked intelligent design, and the ambitions of Truth in Science: "There is just no evidence for intelligent design, it is pure religion and has nothing to do with science. It should be banned from science classes". In October 2006, a science organisation called Science, Just Science reviewed the DVD information packs sent by Truth in Science to the heads of science at all United Kingdom secondary schools in September 2006.

The arguments are presented in the style of an educational film, and are generally presented among needlessly lengthy scientific descriptions and impressive visuals, which help to make creationist arguments sound reasonable to anyone without scientific training in the relevant disciplines. Anyone familiar with creationists will recognize their standard tactics including appeals to emotion, argument from ignorance, misdirection and occasionally blatant falsehoods, -- Science, Just Science, October 2006.

The UK pro-science advocacy group British Centre for Science Education has condemned attempts to introduce the teaching of creationism at British schools. BCSE protested when Truth in Science sent information packs to every UK secondary school in September 2006. In a letter to the editor, published in Financial Times, Ian Lowe of BCSE, expressed concern that creationism could possibly flourish even in Britain, while Mike Brass, chairman of BCSE, said in a letter to The Guardian, "intelligent design (ID) is creationism dressed up in a tux to sneak into our science classrooms."

On 11 October 2006, a reader, Chris Preedy, wrote a letter to The Times newspaper highlighting "scientific errors" on the Truth in Science website, including that the organisation denies the evolution of bacterial flagellum. In response, Richard Buggs, then of the Truth in Science scientific panel published a letter in The Times stating:

"I do not know of a good evolutionary pathway for the development of the bacterial flagellum. In his latest book, Professor Richard Dawkins identifies a single possible intermediate step. This hardly constitutes a pathway."

== See also ==
- Center for Science and Culture
- Creation–evolution controversy
- Critical Analysis of Evolution
- Emmanuel Schools Foundation
- Evolution as theory and fact
- National Center for Science Education
