= Malcolm McIntosh =

Malcolm McIntosh may refer to:

- Sir Malcolm McIntosh (public servant) (1945–2000), Australian scientist and public servant
- Sir Malcolm McIntosh (politician) (1888–1960), Australian politician

== See also ==
- Malcolm Mackintosh (1921–2011), intelligence analyst, civil servant, historian, Sovietologist, and author
- Malcolm Beg Mackintosh, 10th of Mackintosh (died 1457), Scottish clan chief,
