= Chief McIntosh Lake =

Reservoir in Butts County, Georgia, U.S.

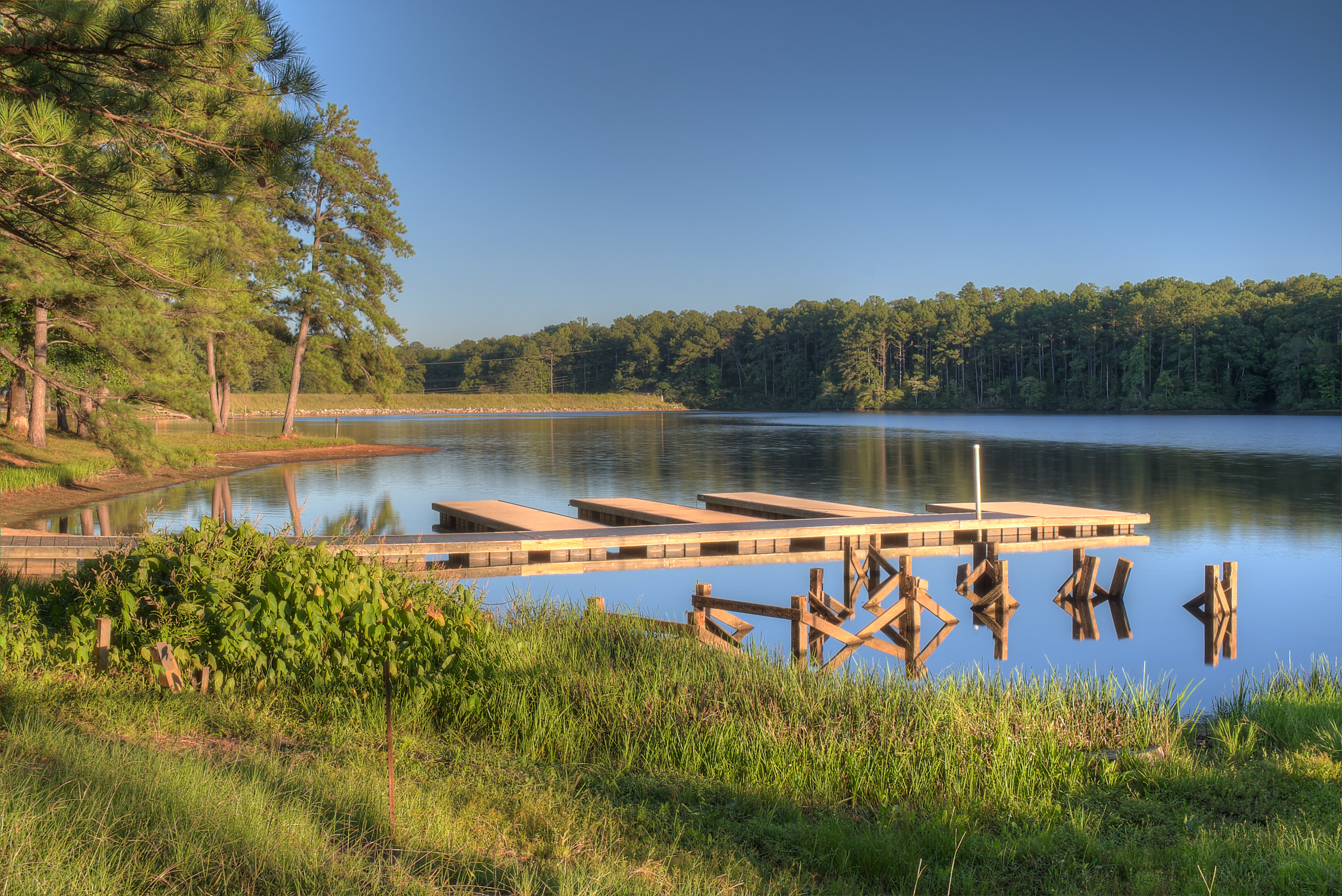
- Chief McIntosh Lake

- Location within Georgia
- Location: Butts County, Georgia
- Coordinates: 33°14′50″N 83°56′02″W
- Type: Reservoir
- Etymology: After William McIntosh
- Basin countries: United States
- Surface elevation: 157 m (515 ft)

Chief McIntosh Lake is a reservoir in the U.S. state of Georgia.

Chief McIntosh Lake was named after William McIntosh (1775–1825), a Creek Nation chief.
