= Elizabeth Grierson =

Native American plantation owner and businesswoman

- Born: ca. 1790; Hillabee, Muscogee Nation
- Died: 1847; Chickasaw Nation, Indian Territory
- Occupations: businesswoman, farm owner
- Criminal charges: miscegenation
- Partner: Dick
- Parents: Robert Grierson (father); Sinnugee Grierson (mother)

Elizabeth Grierson (c. 1790 – 1847) was a 19th-century Muscogee woman from the Hillabee town in the Muscogee Nation, now present-day Alabama.

She was a businesswoman, who used the court system to her advantage. As the Muscogee relationship with people of African descent changed, she became a target of raids and retaliation. She enslaved multiple people and against Muscogee law was in a relationship with one of her former bondsmen, whom she had freed. In 1825, the Muscogee passed a law that barred the marriage of Muscogee and people of African descent. Though wealthy and influential, Grierson was eventually forced to leave Alabama because of her partnership. Settling in Indian Territory, the couple would be forced out of both the Muscogee and Choctaw territory because of their marriage. After living in Arkansas briefly, they found refuge in the Chickasaw Nation.

Since the 20th century, she has often mistakenly been claimed as the wife of William McIntosh, but records created during her lifetime, according to historian Claudio Saunt do not support that conclusion.

== Early life ==
Elizabeth Grierson, also known as Liza, was the daughter of Robert Grierson and his wife, Sinnugee (Muscogee). In the 18th century, Sinnugee, a multi-racial woman probably of mixed Spanish-Native-Black heritage, fled from Spanish Florida and became a refugee in the Muscogee Nation in what is now Alabama. She was adopted into the tribe and into the Spanalgee (Spanish) clan. She lived in the town of Hillabee (also known as Hilabi) located on a small waterway, near Town Creek, which drained into the Hillabahatchee Creek and Tallapoosa River, about 50 miles from present-day Montgomery, Alabama. Around the time of the American Revolutionary War, Sinnugee married a Scottish trader, Robert Grierson. (Note: A newspaper article in The Montgomery Advertiser written by Peter Brannon, states that she was visited by the Indian Agent, Benjamin Hawkins in 1766, but Hawkins was not given authority over the Native people south of the Ohio River until 1796.) Their union was advantageous and created wealth and stability for the family, because Grierson brought networks with colonial administrators and contacts, while Sinnugee's ties within the nation created security and acceptance. The couple had eight children born between 1780 and 1800, including Sandy, Watt (sometimes shown as Walter), Thomas, Sarah, David, and the three youngest, Elizabeth, William, and Katy (also known as Catherine). (Note: Catherine, or Katy, had not yet been born when Hawkins visited the family in 1796.) Elizabeth learned to write and was able to sign her own name.

By the 1790s, as the trade in deerskins was declining, the couple were operating a cotton plantation on 30 acres and had around 300 head of cattle, 30 horses, and 40 enslaved people. Producing around 2,000 pounds of cotton annually, Grierson preferred to pay Native American women to pick his crop. This behavior confused Indian Agent Benjamin Hawkins, who did not understand the kinship ties and relationships of Native people with their slaves. Within the Muscogee nation, slaves who were intermarried were not considered the same as chattel, and their kinship ties prevented their status of bondage from being passed to their descendants. Slaves who were considered to be kin typically performed domestic services, like cooking, cleaning, farming, and gathering firewood, similarly to other family members.

During the Creek War (1813–1814), the wealth and lifeways of Grierson and Sinnugee made them targets of the Red Sticks, who opposed attempts to assimilate Native people. Their son David was murdered by the Red Sticks in April 1813. Three months later, their home was ransacked and many of their slaves and livestock were destroyed or run off. Attacks against the family included an assault of a daughter-in-law, banishment of their son Sandy, and the murder of their daughter Sarah's child Pinkey Hawkins. Despite the attacks, the family refused to leave their home, until it was razed in October. Left without shelter, they fled north and sought aid from the American troops and Cherokee Nation. Grierson appealed to General Andrew Jackson after the family was attacked by Cherokee warriors near what is now Rome, Georgia, writing that his slaves were stolen, as well as his family's food and clothing. Their son William was serving in the brigade of Muscogee soldiers who had enlisted to fight against the Red Sticks and was under the command of Jackson and General John Floyd.

The family finally resettled in what is now Jasper County, Georgia, where William reunited with them in 1814. Borrowing money from a business associate, Grierson was able to buy a plantation and reestablish his family in Georgia, where they remained until the war ended.

In 1817, Henry Walker sued Grierson for payment for having supported him and between 70 and 100 slaves belonging to Robert. Grierson argued that since Walker had the use of his slaves during the time the family resided with him, no money was owed, since their labor would have covered the family's costs. The Superior Court of Jasper County awarded him a judgment, but Grierson and his family returned to the Muscogee lands after the signing of the Treaty of Fort Jackson. Unable to collect, Walker sold the rights to collect the judgment to William McIntosh, who seized around 20 slaves belonging to Grierson and willed them to his wife Susannah and her offspring. To prevent further seizures of her father's property, Elizabeth transported several of his slaves into American territory and out of Muscogee jurisdiction.

== Career ==
In 1817, Elizabeth was enumerated on the Muscogee rolls and Robert conveyed to her slaves named Amitto Jr. and Sr., Ben, Daniel, Diana, Dye, Grace and her child Rinn, Hope, Isaac, Lucy, Lumina, Molly, Nelly, and Rena and her children Dick, Ian, Lidia, Nero, and Polly. He also gave slaves to his daughter Katy at that time, and before 1820 to his sons Watt and Sandy, intending the gifts to provide them with economic security. (Note: Around this time, the family name began to appear as Grayson, reflecting the Muscogee pronunciation of the name, but typically, Elizabeth's name continued to be noted in records with the original spelling.) In 1818, Elizabeth drew up a will granting Dick his freedom upon her death. That year, lands ceded by the Muscogee under the Treaty of Fort Jackson began to be sold. The loss of their lands caused Native traditionalists to seek retaliation, and in 1819 Elizabeth's plantation was targeted. She lost a horse and some axes, and the following year, during another raid, she had farm equipment stolen. In 1819, she sued in Alabama courts to recover her lost property, including the slaves who had been granted to her two years earlier.

Elizabeth by this time had become a businesswoman, often traveling to Montgomery to conduct business, and had experience protecting her property in the courts. The raid which occurred on Elizabeth's plantation in October 1821, included theft of hogs, harnessing chains, and soap, amounting to around $400 (~$9,675 in 2025). Returning in December, raiders took cotton and spun wool, hogs, sheep, and tools. In 1823, nine of her slaves were robbed of their possessions, including clothing, jewelry, and musical instruments. Robbing her slaves was another way of expressing displeasure with Elizabeth. That year, her father died, and McIntosh was appointed as the estate administrator. Elizabeth received her portion of the estate, which included slaves. Among those slaves was her brother William's wife and son; William had been disinherited.

In 1825, McIntosh negotiated for cession of all Muscogee lands in Georgia and removal of the people west of the Mississippi River. The six headmen who signed, all from Lower Creek towns, were not part of the Muscogee National Council, nor did they have authority to sign the Treaty of Indian Springs on behalf of the nation. There were 56 towns in the nation, and 52 of the signatories to the treaty were not chiefs or known to the National Council. In response, the council decreed that McIntosh, his sons-in-law, Samuel and Benjamin Hawkins, (Note: Elizabeth's sister Sarah and her husband Stephen Hawkins were driven out of Creek territory, after their son Samuel's execution was carried out in April, and Benjamin was wounded. That same year, William and his spouse Judah's home was invaded and destroyed.) and others had committed treason and should be executed. That same year, the Muscogee Nation passed a law, that Muscogee people who had Black spouses or children were not entitled to own property, and any property they owned could be distributed to other family members. The law's provisions reflected a change in the position of Blacks within Muscogee society, equating anyone with Black heritage as an enslaved person and ignoring the previous kinship ties of intermarried Blacks. Owning Blacks or intermarrying with them had become a liability, which was problematic for the Griersons as multiracial families were no longer tolerated. (Note: Elizabeth's sister, Katy, first married an African American man. With him, she had two children, John (born 1813) and Annie (born 1814). Around the time she received the gift of slaves from her father in 1817, she and her Black partner separated. She later married Tulwa Tustanagee, a Muscogee man whose English name was Johnnie Benson. They would have ten children together. In 1819, Elizabeth's brother William and his Black partner, Judah, had a son, William, Jr. Around 1823, they had a daughter, Emma, and in 1825 a son named Henderson. By 1834, William and Judah had seven children together.)

The National Council authorized a pardon for McIntosh in June 1825 and agreed to pay claims to those people who had lost property during the raids in the previous period. In 1828, Thomas Grierson, one of Robert's sons, filed a claim for the slaves McIntosh had taken in 1817 for the Walker judgment. The Montgomery County Court decreed that the slaves were the property of Robert's heirs, after Elizabeth filed suit. Thomas then sold his share of his father's slaves to Reuben Jordan. Elizabeth obtained a relinquishment of title from the other heirs and to ensure there would be no later problems, Jordan had Elizabeth confirm the sale of Thomas' slaves. (Note: Thomas later clandestinely took the slaves to Arkansas and sold them to his nephew Benjamin Hawkins, who was prosecuted for their theft. Because Dixon H. Lewis needed Hawkins to assist him in the emigration of the Muscogee people, he paid $1,200 to Jordan to settle his claim and for freeing Hawkins from jail procured deeds to the slaves from Jordan and Hawkins. When Dixon was recalled, he had to sell his property for a loss and made a claim for reimbursement from the United States, which was granted by the 22nd United States Congress.)

Whites began flooding into the area around Hillabee, motivating the family to want to move, but a decree from the nation in 1828 authorized the execution of anyone who enrolled to emigrate. With whites growing more numerous and aggressive, including stealing slaves, Elizabeth made plans to leave in 1830. She enrolled 26 family members (including slaves) to relocate to Indian Territory and filed a bond in Shelby County, Alabama, to emancipate her slave Dick. A Legislative Act in Alabama confirmed his emancipation in 1831.

Their move was postponed when a new treaty was signed in 1832, which allowed half-section land tracts to be allotted to each tribal member. Within five years, the allotments would be converted to fee simple title and allow Natives to dispose of their land as they wished. If they chose to sell before the five-year period had lapsed, government agents had to confirm the terms of the sale were for fair market value and made freely. Elizabeth took an allotment within a few miles of her mother, and siblings Sandy, Watt, and William. She also bought two allotments nearby from neighbors who wanted to sell. In 1834, she transmitted her brother William's wife and children to him. William and Judah emigrated to Indian Territory in 1835, and he filed an emancipation order there in the records of Fort Gibson.

Because Elizabeth and Dick lived together as husband and wife, their union was prohibited, and they were eventually forced to leave Alabama. They migrated to the Muscogee lands in Indian Territory, but found that the racist anti-miscegenation law was enforced in the West as well. They left the Muscogee Nation and settled in the Choctaw Nation, only to discover that the Choctaw had a similar ban. In 1840, they moved again and resettled in Poteau Valley, Arkansas. The couple did not remain in Arkansas long, moving to the Chickasaw Nation.

== Death and legacy ==
Elizabeth died in the Chickasaw Nation, probably in 1847. Her will was settled on October 7, 1847, by the General Council of the Kings and Warriors of the Muscogee Nation. Their decree gave an equitable division of the enslaved Blacks in her estate to her siblings.

After her death, a dispute arose over the ownership of one of her formerly held slaves, named Dinah, when it was alleged that Dick had sold her to another party. During the testimony of the trial, it was noted that Dick and Elizabeth had no children and that under Muscogee law, property was not inherited by a husband, but by the wife's nearest relations. Because the couple had lived in Arkansas when Dinah was purchased, the issue became whether Arkansas law, in which the husband inherited, or Muscogee law, which dictated that property went to the wife's family, prevailed. Chief Justice of the Arkansas Supreme Court George C. Watkins issued an opinion that Elizabeth and Dick were Native Americans and had not acquired citizenship in Arkansas, as they were temporary residents. He ruled that they were Muscogee, and further stated that Muscogee law prevailed unless proof had been provided, which it had not, that the Chickasaw law where they were living at the time of Elizabeth's death, differed from Muscogee inheritance traditions at that time.

The history of the Grierson/Grayson family, according to Saunt illustrates the importance of race in Native history. The changes to Native American communities in the 19th century separated families as those with African ancestry had to find different ways to survive as racial hierarchies became entrenched.

== Genealogical misinterpretations ==
Historian Claudio Saunt wrote in Black, White, and Indian that in the 20th century, many genealogists claimed that Grierson was the primary wife of McIntosh. Saunt noted that there are no historical documents that support that the two were married. He stated that there was contemporary evidence in a letter written from Charles Pendleton Tutt to James Barbour on November 25, 1826, which provided the information that Eliza McIntosh, was the daughter of Stephen Hawkins. McIntosh's wife's maiden name of Hawkins was also accepted by Oklahoma historian, John Bartlett Meserve in his 1932 history of the McIntosh family. Texas historian and professor Judith McArthur, who analyzed the biography of McIntosh's daughter, Rebecca Hagerty, also concluded that McIntosh's senior wife was Eliza Hawkins.

== See also ==
- Native American and Black marriages in the United States
- Native American enslavement of Africans
