= David McIntosh =

David McIntosh may refer to:

- David McIntosh (television personality) (born 1985), English television personality
- David McIntosh (Scottish footballer), Scottish footballer
- Dave McIntosh (1925–1995), Scottish footballer
- David Gregg McIntosh (1836–1916), U.S. Civil War Confederate officer
- David G. McIntosh Jr. (1877–1940), American politician
- David McIntosh (politician) (born 1958), American politician
- David McIntosh (Venezuelan footballer) (born 1973), Venezuelan football centre back
