= Jack McIntosh (Australian footballer) =

Australian rules footballer

Personal information
- Full name: John Thomas McIntosh
- Born: 26 September 1878; Mansfield, Victoria
- Died: 24 June 1944 (aged 65); Prahran, Victoria
- Original team: Mansfield
- Height: 177 cm (5 ft 10 in)
- Weight: 80.5 kg (177 lb)

Playing career^{1}
Years	Club	Games (Goals)
1906	Melbourne	4 (1)
- ^{1} Playing statistics correct to the end of 1906.

John Thomas McIntosh (26 September 1878 – 24 June 1944) was an Australian rules footballer who played with Melbourne in the Victorian Football League (VFL).
