= Fort McIntosh =

Fort McIntosh is the name of several former military installations in the United States:

- Fort McIntosh (Georgia)
- Fort McIntosh (Pennsylvania)
- Fort McIntosh, Texas

== See also ==
- MacIntosh Forts, in Hong Kong
