= Chilly McIntosh =

Farmer, soldier, and member of the Creek Nation

- Born: William Chillicothe McIntosh c. 1800
- Died: October 5, 1875; Fame, Indian Territory (now in McIntosh County, Oklahoma)
- Occupations: Farmer, soldier, preacher
- Years active: 1823–75

Chilly McIntosh (c. 1800–1875) was an important figure in the history of the Creek Nation. (Note: His birth name was William Chillicothe McIntosh, but he apparently never used the full name. Sources almost invariably refer to him as "Chilly.") Born in Georgia to William McIntosh, chief of the Lower Creeks and his wife Eliza, he was the half-brother of D. N. McIntosh and the nephew of Roley McIntosh, another Creek chief. (Note: Roland "Roley" McIntosh was a half-brother of Chief William McIntosh. Later, Roley married Chief Wiliam's widow Susannah and succeeded William as chief. He served in this capacity for 31 years.)

== Sales of Georgia lands ==
Like his father, Chilly signed the Treaty of Indian Springs on January 8, 1821, which sold the land claimed by the Creeks in the state of Georgia. This was Chief William's last act in a series of treaties which ultimately divested the Creeks of their lands. It was specifically illegal, based on a Creek law passed in 1824. Although William was chief only of the Lower Creeks, he had presumed to act as representative of the entire Creek Nation, angering the Upper Creeks and their chief, Menewa. A delegation of Upper Creeks had warned William that such an act would be punishable by death. William committed the act anyway, so after a trial judged William guilty in absentia, Menewa sent a hundred lighthorsemen to carry out the execution. (Note: This group of men was known as law menders.) Not only was Chief William killed, but his house was burned. Chilly, however, escaped and fled to safety. (Note: Two of Chilly's brothers-in-law, Samuel and Benjamin Hawkins, who had also signed the treaty, were captured later that day. Samuel was hanged, but Benjamin escaped after being shot.) Meserve wrote that Chilly lived for several years among the Cherokees.

Chilly had reason to fear for his safety. The National Archives contains a letter he wrote, dated May 17, 1825, to the U.S. Secretary of War, requesting protection from "a party of hostile indians [sic] as was promised by the commissioners at the treaty of the Indian Springs when we ceded our lands to the United States."

== Move to Indian Territory ==
The Lower Creeks, who became known as the McIntosh faction, began negotiating with the Federal government for their removal to Indian Territory. Beginning in February, 1828, Chilly led the first contingent of Lower Creeks to their new homeland. They stopped near the mouth of the Verdigris River, where they began building their towns. Additional contingents, urged on by Roley McIntosh, soon followed.

It is unclear when Chilly returned to the Creek Nation from his self-imposed exile. He and Roley both signed a petition to President Andrew Jackson dated October 19, 1831. The memorial urged Jackson to appoint a commission to adjudicate the disputes between the Creeks and Comanches. It even suggested that Auguste Pierre Chouteau be named one of the commissioners. Chilly attended an intertribal council meeting at Talequah in 1843, where Chief Roley McIntosh addressed the group of some three thousand warriors from eighteen tribes. The result was a peace treaty, which Chilly signed as a representative of the Creeks.

Roley McIntosh became chief of the Lower Creeks after the death of his half-brother. However, Chilly remained an influential leader within the tribe. He signed a treaty at Fort Gibson on November 11, 1838, which adjusted the payments the Federal Government would make to reimburse the monetary losses of the Creeks during their removal. He and his half-brother, D. N. McIntosh both signed a treaty on August 6, 1856, defining specific lands that had been allotted to the Creeks that would be turned over to the Seminole Nation.

During the time between the removal and the Civil War, Chilly became a Baptist minister. (Note: According to a letter published in the Indian Advocate in August 1848, Chilly McIntosh joined the North Fork Baptist church on July 7, 1849. Another letter to the same newspaper related that Chilly was ordained a Baptist minister in 1851.)

== American Civil War service ==
In 1861, both Chilly and his younger brother, D.N. McIntosh, signed the treaty that formally allied the Creek Nation with the Confederate States of America. Despite his age and relative lack of prior military experience, Chilly entered the Confederate Army with the rank of lieutenant colonel, commanding the First Battalion of Creek Cavalry. In 1862, he was promoted to full colonel as the unit was reorganized into the Second Regiment of Creek Mounted Volunteers. He and his troops fought in several battles in the Indian Territory, such as Round Mountain, Pea Ridge, Fort Wayne, and Honey Springs.

== Post-war life ==
Chilly died October 5, 1875, at his home in Fame, Indian Territory. (Note: Fame is now an unincorporated place in McIntosh County, Oklahoma.)

== In literature ==
Lydia Sigourney published her poem Chilly M'Intosh. in 1827. In it she recounts the effects of his treachery and his escape.
