= Hugh McIntosh =

Hugh McIntosh may refer to:

- Hugh McIntosh (civil engineer) (1768–1840), Scottish civil engineering contractor
- Hugh McIntosh (provost) (died 2002), provost of St Mary's Cathedral, Glasgow
- Hugh D. McIntosh (1876–1942), Australian show-business entrepreneur

== See also ==
- Hugh Mackintosh (1870–1936), Scottish theologian
- Hugh Mackintosh (1903–1989), Scottish rugby union player
