= British Centre for Science Education =

The British Centre for Science Education (BCSE) is a volunteer-run organization in the United Kingdom that has the goal of "countering creationism within the UK" and was formed to campaign against the teaching of creationism in schools.

== Activities ==
The BCSE has been operating since the summer of 2006. Its appearance was noted by the American National Center for Science Education in a news article on 2 November 2006.

The BCSE protested when the prominent intelligent design group Truth in Science sent information packs to every UK secondary school in September 2006. BCSE estimated that TiS had, at that point, spent around £116,000, including employment of a full-time administrator. In a letter to the editor, published in the Financial Times, Ian Lowe of BCSE expressed concern that creationism could possibly flourish even in Britain; while Mike Brass, then chairman of BCSE, said in a letter to The Guardian, "intelligent design (ID) is creationism dressed up in a tux to sneak into our science classrooms." They were even mentioned in an "Early Daily Motion" in Parliament introduced by MP Graham Stringer.

In March 2011, responding to a letter from the BCSE expressing concern about the possibility that the government might fund schools based on a Creationist viewpoint, the Department of Education stated that the Secretary of State for Education was "crystal clear that teaching creationism is at odds with scientific fact".

The BCSE features a website on which it tracks leading creationists and creationist organizations, particularly those active in the United Kingdom. Short descriptive articles appear on each. Essays, news and reports of pro-evolution government lobbying are also featured on the website.

== Criticism and controversy ==
The appearance of the BCSE has been met with hostility by the main promoter of intelligent design, the Discovery Institute. In particular, Discovery Institute fellow William Dembski has written disparagingly of the BCSE on his blog, Uncommon Descent.
