= Charles Mackintosh =

Charles Mackintosh (or Macintosh, McIntosh) may refer to:

- Charles Henry Mackintosh (1820–1896), Irish Christian preacher
- Charles Herbert Mackintosh (1843–1931), Canadian politician
- Charles Rennie Mackintosh (1868–1928), Scottish architect and artist
- Charles Macintosh (1766–1843), Scottish chemist and inventor
- Charles Macintosh (composer and naturalist) (1839–1922), Scottish composer and naturalist
- Charles Macintosh (rugby union) (1869–1918), New Zealand rugby player and politician
- Charles McIntosh (1892–1970), Saskatchewan politician
- Charles Edward McIntosh (1836–1915), Canadian American politician in Wisconsin
