= Jack McIntosh (English footballer) =

English footballer

Personal information
- Full name: John McIntosh
- Date of birth: 1876
- Place of birth: Lanchester, County Durham, England
- Position: Forward

Senior career*
Years	Team	Apps	(Gls)
1894–1895	Pallion Star		
1895–1896	Tow Law		
1896–1897	Sunderland	1	(0)
1897–1898	Tow Law		
1898	Sunderland	1	(0)
1898–1???	South Shields		
- * Club domestic league appearances and goals

John McIntosh (1876 – after 1897) was an English professional footballer who played as a forward for Sunderland.
