= McIntosh Reserve =

Outdoor recreation area in Carroll County, Georgia, US

Coordinates: 33.445544°N 84.956692°W

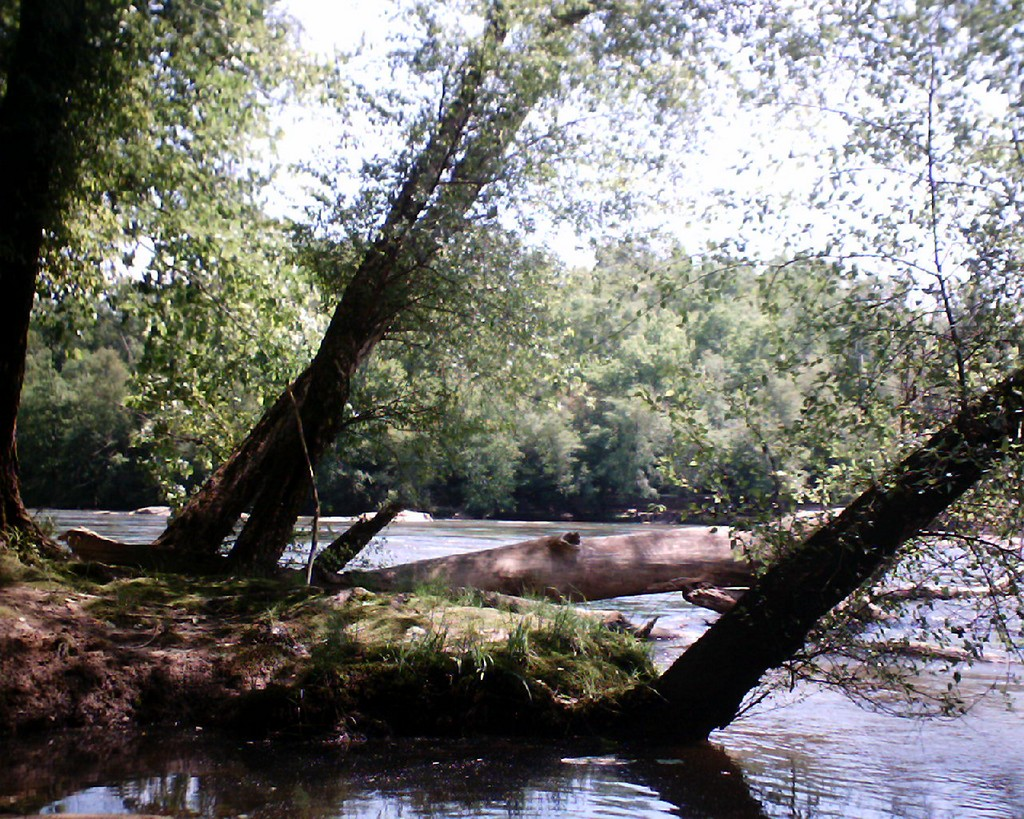
McIntosh Reserve lies along the Chattahoochee River.

McIntosh Reserve is an outdoor recreation area along the Chattahoochee River located in Carroll County, Georgia. The 527-acre (2.13 km^{2}) park is operated by the Carroll County Recreation Department and supports outdoor activities including camping, hiking, fishing, and others. The park is open year-round, closing only on Thanksgiving, Christmas, and New Year's Day. McIntosh Reserve is named for William McIntosh Jr., a prominent Creek Indian leader

== History ==
The Reserve is named for William McIntosh Jr., a prominent Creek Indian leader and planter. The plantation was known as Lochau Talofau, which in English means "Acorn Bluff". It is adjacent to Acorn Creek. McIntosh lived in a modest home, a two-story log house with a central, open "dog run" passage on both floors. The house doubled as an inn for travelers. A reconstructed house is open to park visitors today.

In 1825, McIntosh signed the second Treaty of Indian Springs. The treaty essentially sold all Creek lands in Georgia and Alabama to the United States government; McIntosh was allowed to keep his plantation in exchange for signing the treaty. The treaty had been opposed by the Creek National Council and it violated the Law, the Code of 1818. The Council ordered the execution of McIntosh and other signatories for having committed a capital offense against the government by ceding communal lands, and he was executed at his home in 1825. McIntosh's single-plot, military grave may be found just across the road from the reconstructed house.

Carroll County acquired Lochau Talofau in 1978; the plantation now lies within McIntosh Reserve boundaries. McIntosh Reserve Park was closed for several months in 2009 and 2010, following the September 2009 flooding on the Chattahoochee River. The park was scheduled to reopen for Memorial Day weekend, 2010.

== Activities and events ==
McIntosh Reserve features over 14 miles (23 km) of trails which may be traveled on foot or via bicycle or horseback. A large, flat grassy area is frequently used by model airplane hobbyists or groups seeking an open gathering place. The park also maintains several primitive campsites. The park also features a splash pad with covered enclosures, grills, tables and a scenic river overlook for more family friendly fun and enjoyment. The splash pad features several water sprinklers, and colorful play stations, which allow children of all ages to cool off during the hot summer months.

The park features two ponds and lies along the Chattahoochee River. Fishing is allowed in the park; the nearby town of Whitesburg, Georgia provides access to the river for rafting and canoeing.

Annual events such as the Easter Festival, Halloween Carnival, and Santa Program draw visitors to the park. An annual Fall Festival features a "Native American Pow-Wow," a traditional Native American music and dance performance. The Chattahoochee Challenge Car Show and various club-, hobby-, or scouting-related events also take place in the park.

Polocrosse, a fun game played on horseback and great for a wide variety of ages, is practiced on most Sunday afternoons, weather permitting.
