= David McIntosh (Scottish footballer) =

Scottish footballer

Personal information
- Full name: David McIntosh
- Place of birth: Scotland
- Position: Forward

Senior career*
Years	Team	Apps	(Gls)
1914–1915	Queen's Park	4	(1)
- * Club domestic league appearances and goals

David McIntosh was a Scottish amateur footballer who played as a forward in the Scottish League for Queen's Park.

== Personal life ==
McIntosh served as a sergeant in the Highland Light Infantry during the First World War. He was evacuated to Britain after being wounded in late 1917.

== Career statistics ==
Appearances and goals by club, season and competition
Club	Season	League			Scottish Cup		Other		Total	
Club	Season	Division	Apps	Goals	Apps	Goals	Apps	Goals	Apps	Goals
Queen's Park	1913–14	Scottish First Division	3	1	0	0	0	0	3	1
Queen's Park	1914–15	Scottish First Division	1	0	―		1 (Note: Appearance in Victory Cup)	0	2	0
Career total			4	1	0	0	1	0	5	1
