= Murray McIntosh =

Canadian ice hockey player

- Born: November 17, 1967 (age 58) Calgary, Alberta, Canada
- Height: 5 ft 6 in (168 cm)
- Weight: 164 lb (74 kg; 11 st 10 lb)
- Position: Defence
- Shot: Right
- Played for: DEL; Kassel Huskies; Hannover Scorpions
- NHL draft: Undrafted
- Playing career: 1988–1997

Murray McIntosh (born November 17, 1967) is a Canadian former professional ice hockey defenceman.

McIntosh played nine season of professional hockey in Germany, including three seasons (1994–1997) in the Deutsche Eishockey Liga where he skated with both the Kassel Huskies and Wedemark Scorpions.
