= Lower Muskogee Creek Tribe (East of the Mississippi) =

State-recognized tribe in Georgia, United States

- Nickname: Lower Muskogee Creek Tribe
- Named after: Lower Creeks
- Formation: 1972, incorporated in 1973
- Founded at: Whigham, Georgia
- Type: state-recognized tribe, nonprofit organization
- Tax ID no.: EIN 23-7366825
- Purpose: A80: Historical Societies, Historical Preservation
- Headquarters: Whigham, Georgia
- Location: United States
- Members: 2,800
- Official language: English
- CEO, chief: Marian S McCormick
- Revenue: $469,028 (2019)
- Expenses: $479.089 (2019)
- Funding: grants, services, rental income
- Staff: 5 (2019)
- Website: lowermuskogeetribe.com

The Lower Muskogee Creek Tribe (East of the Mississippi), also known as the Lower Muskogee Creek Tribe, is a state-recognized tribe in Georgia. The organization was denied federal recognition in 1981.

They descend from Muscogee Creek people who evaded Indian Removal in the 1830s and remained in Georgia. Their mission is "To maintain and educate Tribe members and general public regarding tribal history and traditions."

== Nonprofit status ==
The group organized as a 501(c)(3) nonprofit organization in Georgia in 1973. They are based in Whigham, Georgia, and Nealie McCormick is their agent. Their officers are:

- Marian S. McCormick, CEO, chief
- Ashley Adams, CFO
- C. Peggy Venable, secretary
- Nealie McCormick, agent

They also organized as a nonprofit in the state of Florida in 1989; however, they are listed as being inactive.

== Petition for federal recognition ==
In 1948 and 1952, the Muskogee Creeks of Georgia joined with the Creek Nation East of the Mississippi, now known as Poarch Band of Creeks, as a unified group for the purpose of suing for Docket 21 land payments awarded by the Indian Claims Commission. The State of Georgia recognized hundreds of members as eligible for this Docket in 1966. In 1978, the Lower Muskogee Creek Tribe–East of the Mississippi petitioned for federal recognition. The Office of Federal Acknowledgement denied their petition in 1981. The office noted that the Lower Muskogee Creek Tribe's membership criteria "contained no specific requirements for establishing Creek Indian ancestry" and observed that "The LMC is not a tribal community which has functioned as an autonomous entity throughout history until the present, but is rather a group of individuals who believe themselves to be of Indian ancestry, most of whom did not conclusively establish this fact."

== State-recognition ==
The Georgia General Assembly founded the Georgia Council on American Indian Concerns and "is the only state entity specifically authorized to address the concerns of Georgia's American Indians." The council recognizes three state-recognized tribes, including the Lower Muskogee Creek Tribe, who were recognized through state law GA Code Section 44-12-300.

== Activities ==
The Lower Muskogee Creek Tribe holds the annual Tama Intertribal Powwow in Whigham.
