= John MacIntosh =

John MacIntosh or John Macintosh may refer to:

- John Macintosh (1821-1911), Australian politician in New South Wales
- John William MacIntosh (20th century), Canadian politician in British Columbia
