= William McIntosh =

Muscogee chief from Georgia (c. 1775–1825)

- Tvstvnvke Hutkē
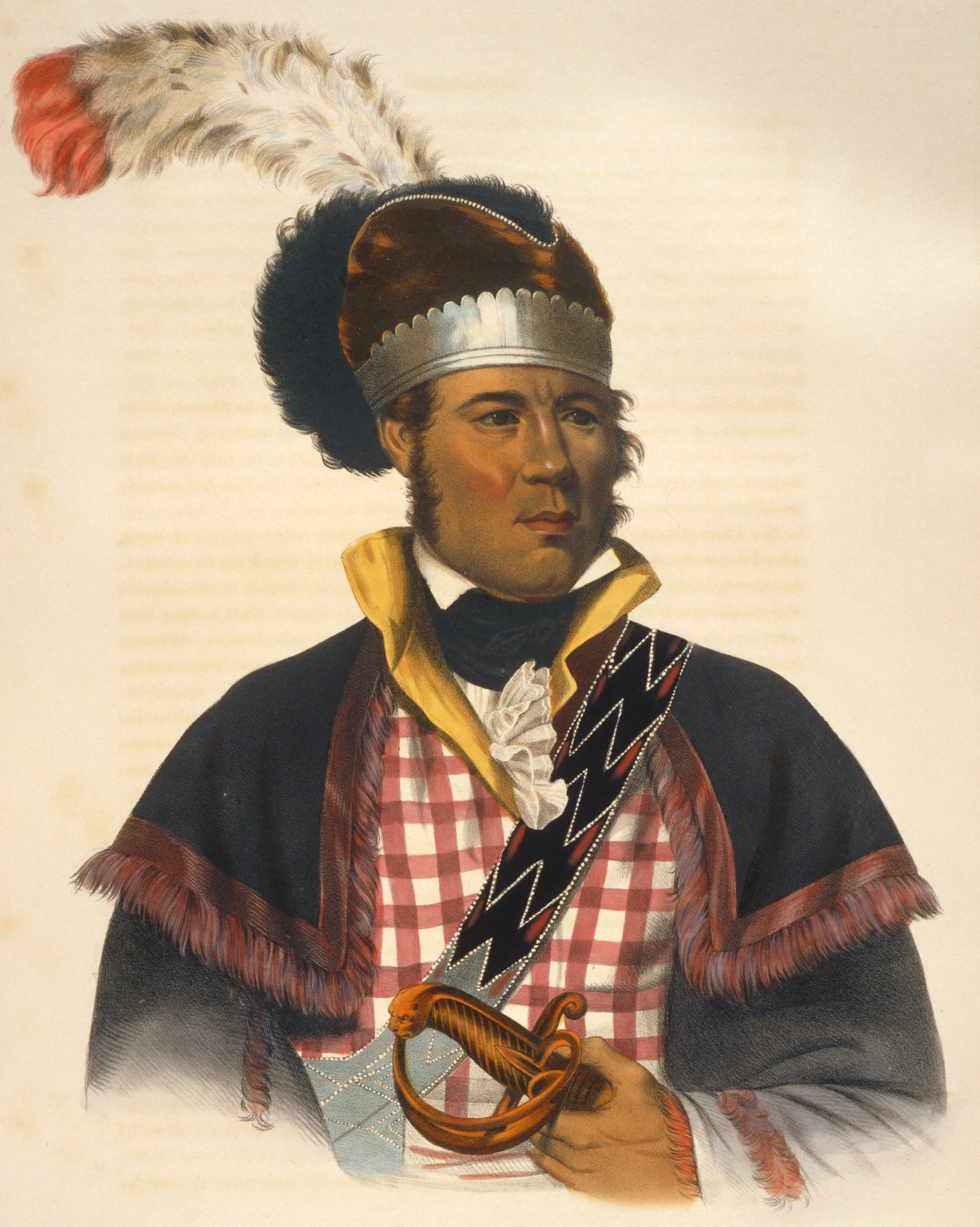
- William McIntosh (1838), painting by Charles Bird King
- Born: William c. 1775; Coweta, Muscogee Creek Nation (present-day Georgia, U.S.)
- Died: April 30, 1825; Carroll County, Georgia
- Cause of death: Execution
- Resting place: Carroll County, Georgia
- Occupations: Chief, military commander, planter, businessman
- Spouse(s): (1) Eliza Hawkins (2) Susannah Ree (or Roe, Rowe, or Coe) (3) Peggy
- Children: Chilly McIntosh, Rebecca, D. N. McIntosh (notables)
- Relatives: Alexander McGillivray, William Weatherford

William McIntosh (c. 1775 – April 30, 1825), also known as Tustunnuggee Hutke (Creek: Tvstvnvke Hutkē; White Warrior), was one of the most prominent Euro-Indigenous American Chiefs of the Muscogee Creek Nation between the turn of the 19th-century and his execution in 1825. He was a chief of Coweta tribal town and commander of a mounted police force. He became a large-scale planter, built and managed a successful inn, and operated a commercial ferry business.

Early European-American historians attributed McIntosh's achievements and influence to his mixed-race (Euro-Indigenous) Scottish and Muscogee ancestry. Since the late 20th century, historians have argued much of McIntosh's political influence stemmed more from his Muscogee upbringing and cultural standing, particularly his mother's prominent Wind Clan in the Muscogee matrilineal system, and to other aspects of Muscogee culture.

Because McIntosh led a group that negotiated and signed the Treaty of Indian Springs in February 1825, which ceded much of remaining Muscogee lands to the United States in violation of Muscogee law, for the first time the Muscogee Creek National Council ordered that a Muscogee be executed for crimes against the Nation. It sentenced him and other signatories to death. McIntosh was executed by his long-time political nemesis Menawa and a large force of Law Menders in late April 1825. Two other signatories were executed. McIntosh's son Chilly was shot at but escaped unharmed. Menawa signed a treaty in 1826 that was very similar in both language and benefits, but one which the Muscogee Creek National Council had agreed to and was therefore considered a legitimate treaty according to contemporary Muscogee law.

The majority of Chief McIntosh's descendants migrated to Indian Territory before 1831, when the U.S. federal government began forcibly removing tribes west in the Trail of Tears. Two of Chief McIntosh's sons, Chilly and Daniel, served as Confederate officers during the American Civil War. Daughter Kate and her family became pre-statehood pioneers of the Florida Panhandle. Daughters Rebecca and Delilah moved to East Texas with their husbands and developed plantations there. Rebecca remarried after her first husband died young, and by 1860 was the wealthiest woman in Texas, owning three plantations with a total of 12,800 acres and 120 enslaved people.

== Early life and education ==
(Tvstvnvke Hutkē (or "White Warrior") was born in the Lower Creek Town of Coweta in present-day Georgia to Scottish-American soldier William McIntosh and to Senoya (also spelled Senoia and Senoy), a Muscogee member of the Wind Clan. As the Muscogee had a matrilineal kinship system, through which property and hereditary positions were passed, his mother's status determined that of White Warrior.

The boy was also named after his father, who was connected to a prominent Savannah, Georgia family. Captain McIntosh, a Loyalist during the Revolutionary War, had worked with the Muscogee to recruit them as military allies to the British. The senior McIntosh's mother was Margaret "Mary" McGillivray, believed to have been a sister of the Scot Lachlan McGillivray, a wealthy fur trader and planter in Georgia. After the Revolutionary War, Captain McIntosh moved from the frontier to Savannah to settle. There, he married a paternal cousin, Barbara McIntosh.

McIntosh gained his status and place among the Muscogee from his mother's clan. Benjamin Hawkins, first appointed as United States Indian agent in the Southeast and then as Superintendent of Indian Affairs in the territory south of the Ohio River, lived among the Muscogee and Choctaws, and knew them well. He commented in letters to President Thomas Jefferson that Muscogee women were matriarchs and had control of children "when connected with a white man." Hawkins further observed that even wealthy traders were nearly as "inattentive" to their mixed-race children as "the Indians". What he did not understand about the Muscogee culture was that the children had a closer relationship with their mother's eldest brother than with their biological father, because of the importance of the clan structure.

McIntosh was considered a skilled orator and politician. He became a wealthy planter and slaveholder; and he was influential in both Muscogee and European-American society. One of his cousins was George Troup, who became governor of Georgia when McIntosh was a prominent chief. Whites sometimes mistakenly assumed that McIntosh had centralized authority over the Muscogee, but he was only one among numerous chiefs, and the central power became the Muscogee Creek National Council, especially after it adopted the Code of 1818.

For generations, Muscogee chiefs had approved their daughters' marriages to fur traders in order to strengthen their alliances and trading power with the wealthy Europeans. Through both his mother and father, McIntosh was related to numerous other influential Muscogee chiefs, most of whom were mixed-race, of Muscogee mothers and white fathers, who were valued as husbands. The most prominent were Alexander McGillivray (1750–1793), the son of Sehoy II, a Wind Clan mother, and Lachlan McGillivray; and William Weatherford (c. 1780–1824), also born to the Wind Clan. Both McIntosh and Weatherford became well-established as Muscogee chiefs and wealthy planters, but Weatherford was aligned with the traditionalist Red Sticks of the Upper Towns in the period of the Creek Wars. The Red Sticks were allied with the British and so he and McIntosh, who was with the Lower Towns and allied with the Americans, were opposed to each other during the conflict.

== Marriages and children ==
Chief McIntosh's first wife was Eliza Hawkins, although she has often erroneously been conflated with Elizabeth Grierson. Married around McIntosh's twenty-fifth birthday, he and Eliza's marriage produced five children: Chillicothe (aka "Chilly"), Jane, Kate, Sallie, and Louis. Their first-born was a son, named Chilly McIntosh (1800–1895), born near Georgia, in Coweta. Their daughter Jane married Samuel Hawkins, Kate married William Cousins, and their daughter Sallie's husband was George McLish. Around the end of the Creek War, McIntosh took a second wife, Susannah Ree (also shown as Roe/Rowe, or Coe), whose heritage is variously given as Cherokee, and full-blooded Muscogee. McIntosh and Susannah had four children: Rebecca, Catherine Hettie, Delilah, and Daniel, known as D.N. As a highly successful soldier and businessman, McIntosh's elevated social/tribal status allowed him to take a third wife, a woman named Peggy. Records conflict as to whether Peggy and McIntosh had three additional children or no children.

Following his death in April 1825, Chief McIntosh's widow Eliza, younger half-brother Roley, and all but one of the chief's children would voluntarily relocate to "Indian Territory" in Eastern Oklahoma between 1826 and 1830 (prior to later federal government-forced removals via the Trail of Tears starting in 1831). Second eldest daughter Kate would remain behind after marrying a full-blooded Muscogee named William Cousins (1800–1876), the grandson of George Cousins (chief of the Eufaula tribe within the Muscogee Confederacy), in August 1825 in Cusseta, Georgia. The young couple remained with Billy's extended tribal kinsmen in Clayton (Barbour County), Alabama until September 1842, when they began traveling by wagon train with three other Muscogee families bound for Oklahoma. A broken wagon wheel unexpectedly delayed their travels near Laurel Hill, Florida . Kate and Billy found their new Northwestern Florida Panhandle surroundings akin to their native homelands and decided to stay—ultimately settling in modern-day Mossy Head in Walton County, Florida, as a pre-statehood Florida pioneer family. As for the rest of the McIntosh Family, once settled in Oklahoma, Chilly and his younger half-brother Daniel McIntosh would both serve as officers with the Confederate States Army during the American Civil War – with Chilly rising to the rank of Colonel.

== Career ==
Chief McIntosh as a leader adopted certain elements of European-American culture. He was interested in introducing American education among the Muscogee, adopted the use of chattel slavery on his plantations, and played a role in centralizing the Muscogee Creek National Council over the years. As a successful merchant and gentleman farmer, he owned more than one hundred black slaves and two plantations where he grew cotton and raised livestock. He also operated two ferries, an inn, and a tavern.

He used his influence to improve a Creek trail connecting the Upper and Lower Towns, that ran from Talladega, Alabama, to the Chattahoochee River. He owned two plantations, Lockchau Talofau ("Acorn Bluff") in present-day Carroll County, and Indian Springs, in present-day Butts County His plantation of Acorn Bluff was at the western terminus of the McIntosh Road, where the chief developed a ferry operation across the Chattahoochee River. Acorn Creek, a tributary of the Chattahoochee located adjacent to the McIntosh estate, is named after the plantation. He owned numerous black slaves to cultivate cotton as a commodity crop on his plantations. He also built a resort hotel at Indian Springs, hoping to attract more travelers along the improved road. Parts of this route are still referred to as the McIntosh Road, or the McIntosh Trail. It passes through several northern counties in Alabama and Georgia.

The Muscogee struggled with internal tensions after the American Revolutionary War and during the War of 1812, as debates surfaced over the increasing adoption of European-American culture. The Lower Towns, which comprised the majority of the population, were adopting some elements of European-American culture and lived more closely in relation to white settlers on the Georgia frontier. Many educated their children in English. Some prominent Muscogee sent their sons to eastern universities for their education, and some adopted Christianity; as well as forms of European dress and houses, hence they qualified as one of the "civilized tribes". They expanded their farms, and many of the Muscogee elite became planters, purchasing enslaved African-Americans to work on plantations in a manner similar to their European-American neighbors.

=== Role in Creek War ===
Internal Muscogee tensions resulted in the Creek War (1813–1814), when tensions between the Lower Creeks and the traditional Red Sticks of the Upper Towns erupted into open conflict. McIntosh and other Lower Creeks allied with United States forces against the Red Sticks after 1813, during the War of 1812. The Red Sticks were allied with the British, as both wanted to limit American expansion in the Southeast. McIntosh fought in support of General Andrew Jackson and state militias in the Battle of Horseshoe Bend, marking the defeat in 1814 of the Red Sticks and the end of the Creek War. McIntosh was appointed a brigadier general of the United States Volunteers by then-Major General Jackson and enjoyed the full emoluments, such as pay and allowances for subsistence, forage and servants, as officers of the same flag officer rank in the United States Army.

The Muscogee were forced to cede lands to the United States in the early 1800s. Maps mark the strips that were ceded over the years. McIntosh played a role in negotiations and cessions of 1805, 1814 (21 million acres after the Creek War), 1818 and 1821. For his role in completing the cession in 1821, American agents awarded McIntosh 1,000 acres of land at Indian Springs and 640 acres on the Ocmulgee River.

After the wars, European-American settlers were increasingly migrating to the interior of the Southeast from the coastal areas and encroached on the territories of the Muscogee and other Southeastern tribes. Cultivation of short-staple cotton, which did well in these areas, was made profitable by Eli Whitney's invention of the cotton gin in the 1790s, which mechanized processing of the cotton. Lands were developed in the piedmont areas for large cotton plantations, stimulating a demand for African-American slaves that resulted in the forcible migration of more than one million slaves to the Deep South in the domestic trade.

=== First Seminole War ===
Remnants of Muscogee Confederacy and Miccosukee, and Yuchi, as well as other American Indian tribes plus maroons (fugitive enslaved people) had migrated to Spanish Florida during the late 18th century when they formed a new tribe, known as the Seminole. Enslaved African-Americans from Georgia also escaped and took refuge in Spanish Florida, where the Spanish Crown offered them freedom and land in exchange for converting to Catholicism.

After the War of 1812, the British withdrew and turned over the fort they constructed at Prospect Bluff on the lower Apalachicola River to newly freed African-Americans in the area. It was occupied by about 300 African-American men, women, and children, 20 renegade Choctaw, and a few Seminole warriors, led by an African-American former Colonial Marine named Garçon. Among the African-Americans were members of the disbanded British Corps of Colonial Marines. Georgia slaveholders and the U.S. Army called it the "Negro Fort," and worried that the autonomy of the blacks would encourage their own slaves to escape or rebel. McIntosh fought with the United States in the First Seminole War and helped capture the fort. When the Americans shot a heated cannonball into the fort, it struck the magazine and set off a huge explosion. Most of the people within the fort died immediately.

=== Formation of a centralized Muscogee government ===
Chief McIntosh was actively involved in collaborating with chiefs from the Upper and Lower Towns (then primarily located in Alabama and Georgia, respectively) through the Muscogee Creek National Council in developing a centralized government that borrowed from Anglo-American traditions. They formulated laws in the Code of 1818, which protected communal tribal property and established a police force known as the Law Defenders. In an effort to protect their remaining lands, the National Council, including McIntosh, had passed legislation in 1824 making it a capital crime to alienate communal land.

=== Annuities and African importation case of 1820 ===
Like other prominent chiefs, McIntosh worked closely with Benjamin Hawkins, the U.S. Indian Supervisor in the Southeast for two decades until 1816. Hawkins was instrumental in gaining Muscogee cessions of land through that period, but he also supported McIntosh's efforts to bring European-American education to the territory by welcoming missionaries who set up schools.

After President James Monroe came to office, in November 1817 his administration appointed David Brydie Mitchell as the U.S. Indian Agent to the Muscogee Creek Nation. Mitchell had formerly been the governor of Georgia (1809–1813) (1815–1817), as well as holding other posts in the state. After the Creek War, the people suffered from the disruption. The U.S. provided food and supplies as part of the annuities for the land cessions, especially the 21 million acres the Muscogee were forced to cede following the war. Mitchell and McIntosh were suspected of controlling some of the distribution of food and annuities for their own benefit in this period, increasing McIntosh's power among the Muscogee.

In addition, Mitchell was implicated in the African importation case, in which Africans illegally-imported as slaves were held at the Creek Agency on their sovereign land, for sale in the Mississippi Territory. This was tried in Admiralty Court as Miguel de Castro v. Ninety-five African Negros (1819–1820) because it violated U.S. law, effective 1808, to end the international African slave trade.

The privateer "Commodore" Aury had taken the Africans as a prize from a Spanish ship bound for Havana, Cuba, where Spain continued slavery. He transported them to Amelia Island off Florida. William Bowen bought 110 slaves for $25,000 and had them taken to the Indian agency in the Muscogee Creek Nation in two batches: in December 1817 and January 1818. Mitchell appeared to be primarily responsible for keeping the Africans at the Muscogee agency, which was considered outside U.S. territory as it was within the Muscogee Creek Nation. This was prior to the expected sale of the slaves in the Mississippi Territory, then including Alabama. Too many people learned about the presence of the Africans, and Mitchell was prosecuted over the issue.

President Monroe replaced Mitchell in 1821 with John Crowell, who had previously served as an Alabama Congressman. That year, the Muscogee agreed to another land cession in order to raise money for needed food and supplies, as conditions were still difficult for them.

=== Treaty of Indian Springs (February 1825) ===
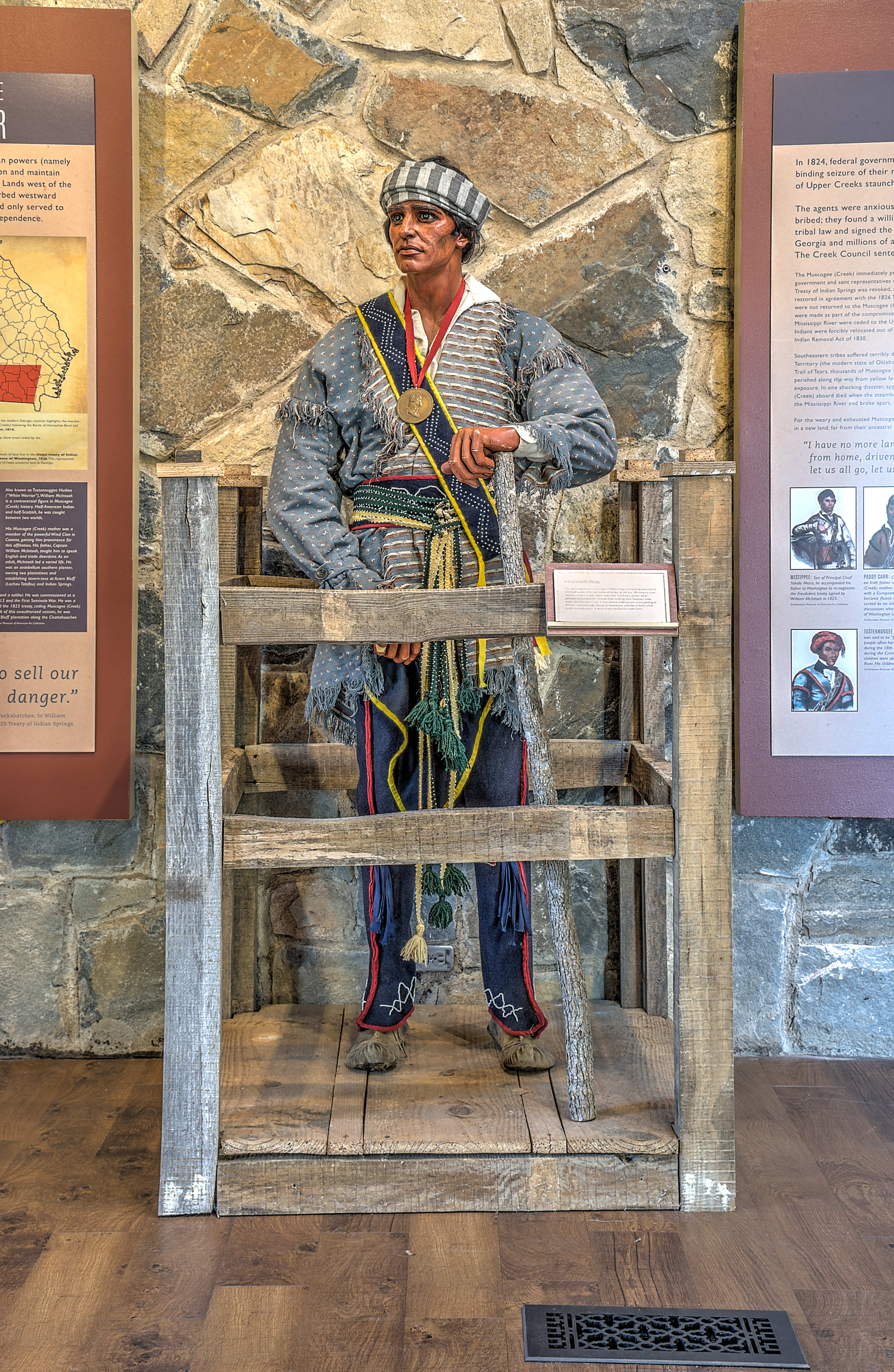
Exhibit at Indian Springs State Park Museum

Under pressure from the United States and the state of Georgia, Chief McIntosh and some Muscogee chiefs had ceded land in 1821. The National Muscogee Creek Council at that time considered execution of McIntosh for this breach of law but did not proceed. The United States' growing European population, particularly in the Northeast, put pressure on the federal government to take more Indian land. The federal government continued to try to persuade or force the Muscogee and other Southeastern tribes to cede the remainder of their lands in exchange for payments and land west of the Mississippi River in what was called Indian Territory (present-day Oklahoma and Arkansas.)

On February 12, 1825, McIntosh and eight other chiefs signed the Treaty of Indian Springs. These chiefs included Samuel and Benjamin Hawkins, mixed-race Muscogee sons of Stephen Hawkins, who was also of mixed race; however, McIntosh was the only chief who was a member of the Muscogee Creek National Council. The brothers had both been educated at Princeton. Samuel had married McIntosh's daughter Jane, and Benjamin would later marry his daughter Rebecca.

The treaty ceded all the remaining Muscogee land in Georgia (the Upper and Lower Towns) plus 3,000,000 acres in Alabama to the United States in exchange for $200,000 and annuities to be paid to the Muscogee nation. Another $200,000 was paid directly to McIntosh. The fifth article of the treaty stipulated that McIntosh receive payment for lands he was previously granted in 1821. Historians continue to argue over whether McIntosh ceded the land for personal gain, or because he believed removal was inevitable, and he was trying to achieve some security for the Muscogee Creek Nation. Historians like Michael Green believe that McIntosh sold away the tribe's birthright and future, describing the treaty as

Fraudulent by the standards of any society, concluded in violation of the expressed orders of both interested governments, riddled with bribery, chicanery, and deceit, the treaty illegally acquired for Georgia and Alabama, through the offices of the United States, an enormous amount of land.

As soon as the Muscogee Creek National Council learned of this, they protested to Washington, but the U.S. Senate had already ratified the treaty. Initially Washington officials tried to carry it out. Governor George Troup of Georgia, a cousin of McIntosh, had promised him protection, but put pressure on him to survey lands ahead of time, as Georgia wanted to prepare for a land lottery. Under the treaty the Muscogee had until late 1826 to leave the ceded territory.

== Death ==
Under its Code of 1818, the National Council had established a police force, known as Law Menders. The Council ruled that the signatories of the February 1825 treaty had to be executed for ceding the communal Muscogee lands, which was defined as a capital crime. This was the first known occasion when the Council ordered the execution of men for a crime against the centralized Nation. The Council assigned chief Menawa, of a ceded township in the Upper Towns, to carry out the sentence.

On April 30, 1825, the Red Stick leader and long-time McIntosh political nemesis Menawa, with a large force of 120-150 Law Menders (the recently organized Muscogee police force) from towns in the ceded territory, attacked the McIntosh plantation, lighting bonfires around the buildings. Then they set McIntosh's house on fire. McIntosh, wounded by gunfire, was pulled from the burning house by several attackers, then one of the men stabbed him in the heart. Other Muscogee shot him more than fifty times. Chilly McIntosh, the chief's oldest son, had also been sentenced to die, but he escaped by diving through a window. Etommee Tustunnuggee, another Muscogee chief who signed the 1825 treaty, was killed during the raid. Later that day, the Law Menders found the Hawkins brothers, who were also signatories. They hanged Samuel and shot Benjamin, but he escaped. The Muscogee had "adopted certain Anglo-American legal concepts, ... welded them to their own concepts of political independence and used them to serve decidedly Creek purposes."

William McIntosh's wives asked for a suit of clothes for his burial, but the killers insisted on throwing the naked corpse into an unmarked grave. His burial site and part of his plantation have been preserved as the McIntosh Reserve in Carroll County, Georgia. The grave is located near a replica of McIntosh's home in McIntosh Reserve Park near Whitesburg.

Members of the National Council, including Menawa, went to Washington to protest the 1825 treaty. The U.S. government rejected the 1825 treaty as fraudulent, and negotiated the 1826 Treaty of Washington, which allowed the Muscogee to keep about 3 million acres (12,000 km^{2}) in Alabama. In this new treaty, the Muscogee received an immediate payment of $217,660 and a perpetual annuity of $20,000. The state of Georgia ignored the new treaty and worked to evict the Muscogee from their lands before official removal started in the 1830s.

== Legacy ==
After William's death, his younger half-brother Roley McIntosh advanced to serve as chief of the Lower Creeks until 1859, moving with them to Indian Territory in the 1830s. His first wife had died and the widower married Susannah, the widow McIntosh.

Led by his son Chilly, McIntosh's family and other Muscogee voluntarily moved to Indian Territory from 1826 to 1830, where they settled at the forks of the Arkansas, Verdigris and Grand (Neosho) rivers, setting up the Western Muscogee Nation. His two sons Chillicothe and Daniel McIntosh both served as Confederate officers in the Civil War. Chilly founded the 1st Creek Mounted Volunteers (later known as the First Creek Cavalry Regiment, C.S.A.); Chilly founded the 2nd Creek Mounted Volunteers (later known as the Second Creek Cavalry Regiment, CSA). Both brothers later became Baptist ministers in the Indian Territory. Eight McIntosh men served with the Confederate Army during the war.

Daughter Catherine "Kate" McIntosh and her Eufaula husband Billy Cousins became a pre-statehood Florida pioneer family after settling in the sparsely populated Northwestern Florida Panhandle in September 1842.

Daughter Rebecca McIntosh married Benjamin Hawkins in the Western Muscogee Nation in 1831. Benjamin knew Sam Houston, and in 1833 he and Rebecca moved to Marion County, Texas, on the territory's eastern border, where they developed the Refuge plantation. Their son William died young, and they had two daughters, Louisa and Anna. Benjamin Hawkins died in 1836 in Texas, killed near Nacogdoches.

By the 1840s, Rebecca's sisters Delilah McIntosh, who married William Drew, and Catherine Hettie McIntosh, who married James D. Willison, were settled in Texas with their husbands and families on part of the Hawkins property. Delilah and William Drew's 2400-acre plantation, called Falonah, was near the Refuge. The widow Rebecca McIntosh Hawkins married Spire M. Hagerty, who held land and slaves on his Phoenix plantation in Harrison County, Texas. He died in December 1849 in Montgomery County, Alabama. By 1860, Rebecca Hagerty was the richest woman in Texas at the age of 45. She was the only woman who in 1860 owned more than 100 slaves, and likely the only Native American in Texas to do so. She owned three plantations: the third was in Cass County, and the total properties amounted to 12,800 acres. In 1860, her "personal wealth was reported to have been $85,000, and her real estate valued at $35,000. She was the wealthiest person in Marion County, where her plantation Refuge was located. Most of her personal wealth was attributed to the value of the 102 people she held in bondage."

- The McIntosh Reserve Park was established in Whitesburg, Georgia.
- Chief McIntosh Lake in Georgia is named after him.
- McIntosh High School in Peachtree City, Georgia is named after him.
- In 1921, McIntosh's grave was marked by a boulder with a bronze tablet placed by the William McIntosh Chapter, DAR in October 1921. The inscription states:

To the Memory and Honor of General William McIntosh

The Distinguished and Patriotic Son of Georgia whose devotion was heroic, whose friendship unselfish and whose service was valiant. Who negotiated the treaty with the Creek Indians which gave the state all lands lying west of the Flint River. Who sacrificed his life for his patriotism.

Erected by

William McIntosh Chapter

D. A. R.

Jackson, Georgia, 1921."

- In the early 21st century, the McIntosh Trail was being proposed as a state scenic byway in several counties of northern Georgia in a project by the McIntosh Trail Historic Preservation Society. The chief had improved this trail to connect the Upper and Lower Towns, and bring commerce to the area, including to his hotel at Indian Springs and the ferry at the terminus. By 2011 the Trail had received preliminary approval for its alignment, with the Three Rivers Commission due to review its corridor plan.

== References in other media ==
- Lydia Sigourney's poem Chilly M'Intosh. was published in her 1827 collection of poetry.
- William Gilmore Simms, wrote a poem about William McIntosh, "The Broken Arrow," published in The Book of My Lady: A Melange. By a Bachelor Knight (Philadelphia, 1833).
- Betty Collins Jones, Clouds across the Moon (1991), romance novel.
- Billie Jane McIntosh, a 3x great-granddaughter of McIntosh, wrote Ah-ko-kee, American Sovereign (2002), a novel featuring McIntosh's daughter Jane McIntosh Hawkins; this is not a history.
- Billie Jane McIntosh also wrote a biographical novel about Jane's brother in From Georgia Tragedy To Oklahoma Frontier: A Biography of Scots Creek Indian Chief Chilly McIntosh (2008)
- B.J. McIntosh wrote a screenplay about William McIntosh in 2014. Matt Collins is marketing the work through his company, Brit Nicholas Entertainment.
