= Donald McIntosh (mathematician) =

Scottish educator and mathematician

Donald Cameron McIntosh FRSE
- Born: 13 January 1868; Tomintoul, Scotland
- Died: 1 July 1957 (aged 89); Boat of Garten, Scotland
- Education: University of Aberdeen
- Scientific career
- Fields: Mathematics
- Workplaces: Edinburgh Ladies' College

Donald Cameron McIntosh FRSE (13 January 1868 – 1 July 1957) was a Scottish educator and mathematician.

== Biography ==
McIntosh was born at Tomintoul, Banffshire, Scotland on 13 January 1868. He was educated at Tomintoul Parish School and Aberdeen Grammar School. He studied at the University of Aberdeen graduating with a MA in 1890, a BSc in marine zoology 1906 and a DSc in 1912 with a thesis entitled Studies on Echinodermata and on Variation.

From 1890 to 1899 he was a teacher at George Watson's College, in Edinburgh, and Head of Mathematics at Edinburgh Ladies' College from 1899 to 1918. From 1918 to 1933 he was Director of Education in Moray and Nairn.

He was a member of the Edinburgh Mathematical Society and the Royal Physical Society of Edinburgh.

He was elected as a Fellow of the Royal Society of Edinburgh in 1903. His proposers were John Sturgeon Mackay, Sir Francis Grant Ogilvie, Sir John Murray and Alexander Morgan.
