= John Mackintosh =

John Mackintosh may refer to:

- John Mackintosh (luthier) (c. 1780–1850), Scottish luthier and author
- John MacKintosh (1790–1881), farmer and politician in Prince Edward Island
- John Mackintosh (soldier) (1797–1846), British military aide-de-camp to Simon Bolivar and Antonio Jose de Sucre, commander of the British Legion and the Albion and Santander Battalions in the South American wars of independence
- John Mackintosh (historian) (1833–1907), Scottish historian
- John Mackintosh (philanthropist) (1865–1940), Gibraltarian businessman and philanthropist
- John Mackintosh (confectioner) (1868–1920), founder of the British confectionery company Mackintosh's
- John Mackintosh (Canadian politician) (1890–1965), Canadian provincial politician from Alberta
- John Mackintosh, 2nd Viscount Mackintosh of Halifax (1921–1980), British peer
- John Mackintosh (Scottish politician) (1929–1978), Scottish Labour politician
- Clive Mackintosh, 3rd Viscount Mackintosh of Halifax (John Clive Mackintosh, born 1958), British peer

== See also ==
- John Mackintosh Square, the main square in Gibraltar
- John Mackintosh Hall, the main cultural center in Gibraltar
- John McIntosh (disambiguation)
