= Thomas McIntosh (footballer) =

Scottish footballer

Personal information
- Full name: Thomas McIntosh
- Place of birth: Scotland
- Position: Winger

Senior career*
Years	Team	Apps	(Gls)
1890–1891	Linthouse		
1891–1892	Clyde		
1892–1894	The Wednesday	9	(1)
1894	Linthouse		
Total		9	(1)
- * Club domestic league appearances and goals

Thomas McIntosh was a Scottish footballer who played in the Football League for The Wednesday.
