= Andrew McIntosh (physicist) =

British academic

- Education: University of Wales (DSc); Cranfield Institute of Technology (PhD)
- Known for: Advocacy of Intelligent design
- Scientific career
- Fields: Chemical engineering, combustion, thermoacoustics
- Institutions: University of Leeds
- Thesis: Unsteady premixed laminar flames (1981)
- Doctoral advisor: John Frederick Clarke

Andrew McIntosh (also known as Andy McIntosh) is a British physicist who is a professor emeritus of thermodynamics and combustion theory at the University of Leeds. He is also the director of the organisation Truth in Science which promotes creationism and intelligent design.

His research-group has received the outstanding contribution to innovation and technology award from the Times Higher Education awards in London in 2010 for developing a technology based on the defence mechanism of bombardier-beetle.

== Creationism ==
In a 2007 discussion with Richard Dawkins on BBC Radio Ulster, McIntosh argued that the principles of thermodynamics are not consistent with Darwinian evolution.

In November 2006, the University of Leeds issued a statement distancing itself from creationism, and described McIntosh's directorship of Truth in Science as being unconnected with his teaching or research.

== Publications ==
- Origins: Examining the Evidence (Truth in Science, 2011) ISBN 978-0956963109
- The Delusion of Evolution (New Life Publishing Co, 2010) ISBN 978-1904835028
- Genesis for Today: Showing the Relevance of the Creation/Evolution Debate to Today's Society (foreword by Ken Ham) (Day One Publications, 2000) ISBN 978-1-903087-15-2
- Shah, AA; Brindley, J; McIntosh, AC; Radernacher, J (2008). "The effects of heat exchange and fluid production on the ignition of a porous solid" (PDF). Nonlinear Analysis: Real World Applications. 9 (2): 562–584. doi:10.1016/j.nonrwa.2006.12.002.
- McIntosh, AC (2007). "Combustion, fire, and explosion in nature - some biomimetic possibilities". Proceedings of the Institution of Mechanical Engineers, Part C. 221 (10): 1157–1163. doi:10.1243/09544062jmes541. S2CID 110692518.
