= Andrew McIntosh (cricketer) =

Papua New Guinean cricketer

Personal information
- Full name: Andrew McIntosh
- Born: 17 July 1980 (age 46); Madang, Madang Province, Papua New Guinea
- Batting: Right-handed
- Bowling: Leg break

International information
- National side: Papua New Guinea

Career statistics
Competition	List A
Matches	4
Runs scored	42
Batting average	14.00
100s/50s	–/–
Top score	18
Balls bowled	90
Wickets	3
Bowling average	25.33
5 wickets in innings	–
10 wickets in match	–
Best bowling	3/14
Catches/stumpings	1/–
- Source: Cricinfo, 22 May 2011

Andrew McIntosh (born 17 July 1980) is a Papua New Guinean cricketer. McIntosh is a right-handed batsman who bowls leg break. He was born in Madang, Madang Province.

McIntosh made his debut for Papua New Guinea in the 2011 World Cricket League Division Two. It was in this tournament that he made his List A debut against Bermuda. He played a further 3 List A matches in the competition, the last of which was against Hong Kong. In his 4 matches, he scored 42 runs at a batting average of 14.00, with a high score of 18. With the ball, he took 3 wickets at a bowling average of 25.33, with best figures of 3/14.
