= Whitesburg, Georgia =

- Town
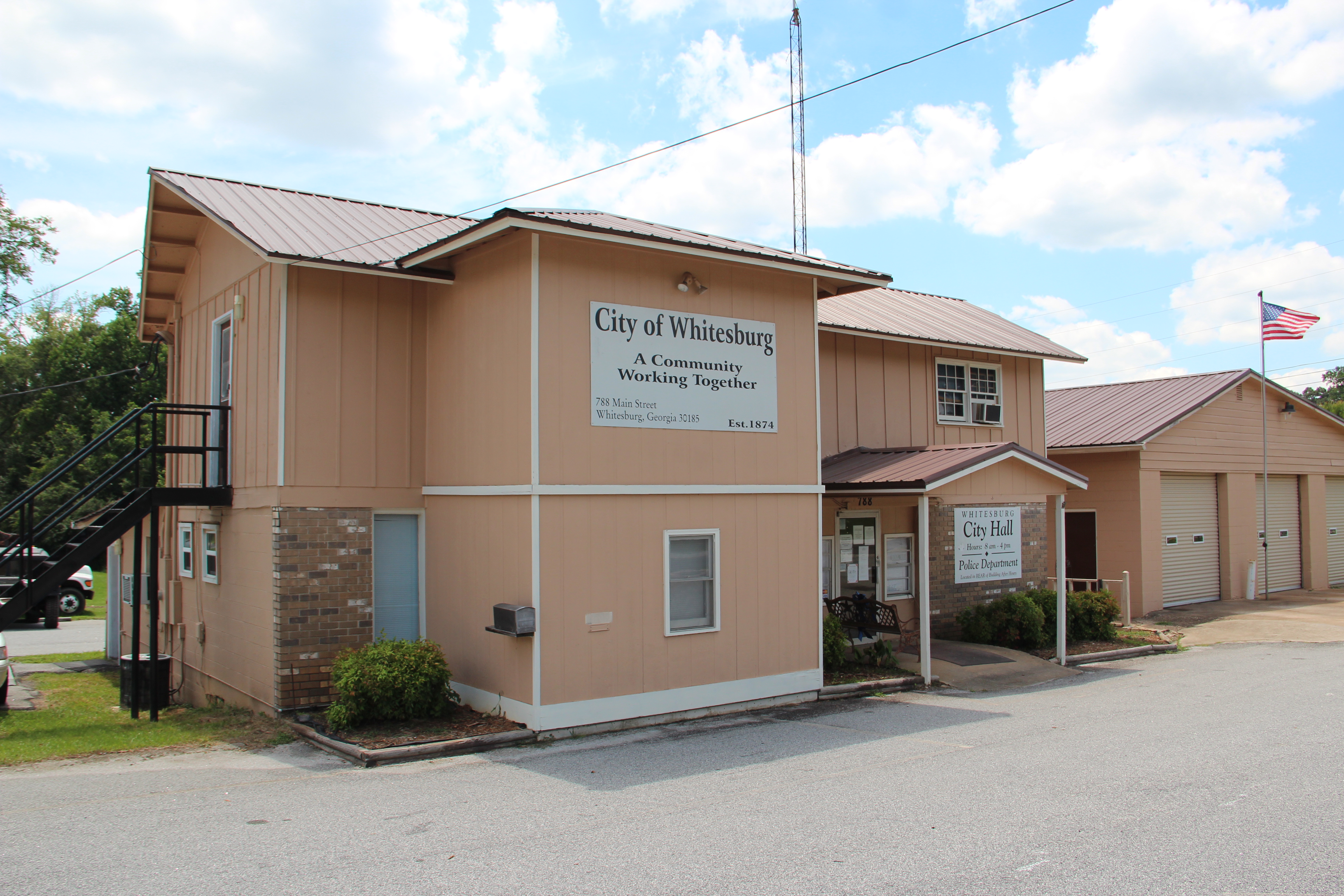
- Whitesburg City Hall

- Logo

- Location in Carroll County and the state of Georgia
- Coordinates: 33°29′36″N 84°54′49″W
- Country: United States
- State: Georgia
- County: Carroll

Area
  - Total: 2.80 sq mi (7.24 km^{2})
  - Land: 2.77 sq mi (7.17 km^{2})
  - Water: 0.027 sq mi (0.07 km^{2})
- Elevation: 846 ft (258 m)

Population (2020)
  - Total: 596
  - Density: 215.3/sq mi (83.11/km^{2})
- Time zone: UTC-5 (Eastern (EST))
  - Summer (DST): UTC-4 (EDT)
- ZIP code: 30185
- Area code: 770
- FIPS code: 13-82720
- GNIS feature ID: 0325222
- Website: https://www.whitesburg-ga.com/

Whitesburg is a town in Carroll County, Georgia, United States. The population was 596 in 2020.

== History ==
This area was long occupied by indigenous peoples. In the historic period after European encounter, it was occupied by members of the Creek Confederacy, a loose grouping of related peoples, and was known as the area of the Lower Towns by the early nineteenth century. William McIntosh, a mixed-race leader of the Creek, established a modest house and plantation here. He was executed in 1825 on order of the Creek National Council for having negotiated and signed the 1825 Treaty of Indian Springs, which ceded all remaining lands in Georgia and Alabama to the United States. He had violated tribal law, the Code of 1818 that protected communal property.

After Creek removal, American settlers entered the area from the east. Many became subsistence farmers. Whitesburg was established by European-American settlers in 1873. The community was named after A.J. White, a railroad official. The Georgia General Assembly incorporated Whitesburg in 1874.

== Geography ==
Whitesburg is located at 33°29′36″N 84°54′49″W (33.493434, -84.913492).

Whitesburg is located along the Chattahoochee River in southeastern Carroll County. U.S. Route 27 Alternate and Georgia State Route 5 are the main routes through the town. U.S. Route 27 Alternate runs from northwest to southeast through the town, leading northwest 12 mi (19 km) to Carrollton, the county seat, and southeast 11 mi (18 km) to Newnan. GA-5 leads northeast from the town 23 mi (37 km) to Douglasville and west 15 mi (24 km) to Roopville.

According to the United States Census Bureau, the town has a total area of 2.8 square miles (7.3 km^{2}), of which 2.8 square miles (7.2 km^{2}) is land and 0.04 square mile (0.1 km^{2}) (1.07%) is water.

Acorn Creek, a tributary of the Chattahoochee River, originates just west of Whitesburg. It takes its name from Acorn Town, a Creek Indian settlement and plantation which stood near its mouth.

== Demographics ==
Historical population
Census	Pop.	Note	%±
1880	368		—
1890	294		−20.1%
1900	296		0.7%
1910	315		6.4%
1920	366		16.2%
1930	313		−14.5%
1940	341		8.9%
1950	400		17.3%
1960	366		−8.5%
1970	720		96.7%
1980	775		7.6%
1990	643		−17.0%
2000	596		−7.3%
2010	588		−1.3%
2020	596		1.4%
U.S. Decennial Census

At the census of 2000, there were 596 people, 224 households, and 165 families residing in the town. The population density was 215.1 inhabitants per square mile (83.1/km^{2}). There were 247 housing units at an average density of 89.1 per square mile (34.4/km^{2}). The racial makeup of the town was 82.21% White, 16.78% African American, 0.17% Native American, 0.17% Asian, and 0.67% from two or more races. Hispanic or Latino of any race were 0.34% of the population. By the 2020 census, there were 596 people in Whitesburg.

In 2000, there were 224 households, out of which 29.9% had children under the age of 18 living with them, 54.5% were married couples living together, 14.3% had a female householder with no husband present, and 25.9% were non-families. 21.9% of all households were made up of individuals, and 10.7% had someone living alone who was 65 years of age or older. The average household size was 2.66 and the average family size was 3.10. In the town, the population was spread out, with 25.5% under the age of 18, 10.1% from 18 to 24, 26.8% from 25 to 44, 23.2% from 45 to 64, and 14.4% who were 65 years of age or older. The median age was 36 years. For every 100 females, there were 94.8 males. For every 100 females age 18 and over, there were 88.9 males.

In 2000, the median income for a household in the town was $26,750, and the median income for a family was $29,167. Males had a median income of $30,417 versus $22,353 for females. The per capita income for the town was $14,189. About 14.6% of families and 18.7% of the population were below the poverty line, including 27.7% of those under age 18 and 19.5% of those age 65 or over. As of the 2022 American Community Survey, its median household income was $63,750.
