= D. N. McIntosh =

Creek rancher, soldier, and politician

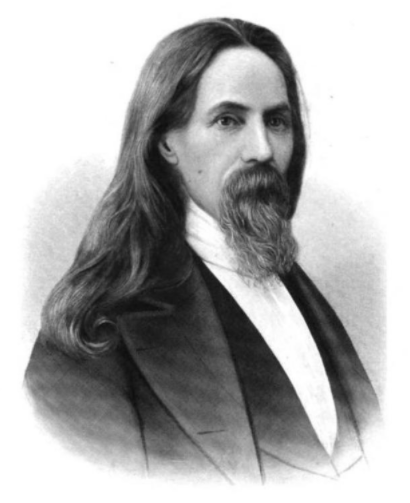
- Born: Daniel Newnan McIntosh; September 20, 1822; Indian Springs, Georgia
- Died: April 10, 1895 (aged 72); Creek Nation. Indian Territory
- Occupations: Farmer, rancher, military leader, businessman and preacher
- Known for: Founder and leader of Creek Regiment in the U. S. Civil War

Daniel Newnan McIntosh (1822–1896), often identified as D. N. McIntosh, was a Native American rancher, soldier and politician, the youngest son of Muskogee Chief William McIntosh (1790–1825). He was a member of one of the most influential Lower Creek families of the 19th century; after they migrated west in 1828, they continued as leaders of what was then called the Western Creek Nation.

During the American Civil War, D. N. McIntosh organized a regiment and joined the Confederate States Army as a colonel. He was notable for recruiting and organizing the 1st Creek Mounted Volunteers and for leading them in several battles in Indian Territory. After the war, he continued as a farmer and rancher.

== Early years ==
According to one source, McIntosh, known as "D.N.", was born near Newnan, Georgia. However, Meserve wrote that D. N. was born September 20, 1822, at Indian Springs, Georgia. (Note: The Encyclopedia of Oklahoma History and Culture gives this man's middle name as Newman.) He was the youngest son of William McIntosh, a prominent Creek chief of the Lower Towns, and his second wife Susannah Rowe/Roe (also referred to as Ree). His father named him after Daniel Newnan, a Georgia militia leader who he knew and admired. Daniel was about 22 years younger than his elder half-brother, Chillicothe (known as Chilly), who was the eldest child of William and his first wife Susannah Rowe/Roe. McIntosh also had several daughters by his wives.

After his father was executed by order of the Creek National Council in 1825 for having ceded communal Creek territory to the United States in violation of tribal law, the surviving members of the family moved to Indian Territory in 1828, where they settled on the Verdigris River. They established what was known as the Western Creek Nation for some time. Daniel was sent back East to be educated at Smith's Institute in Kentucky until 1841. D. N. later moved to a site near the community of Fame, in what is now McIntosh County, Oklahoma. He developed a farm and also raised cattle.

In 1850, D. N. McIntosh was licensed as a Baptist preacher.

== Marriages and family ==
D. N. McIntosh is recorded as having married four times and, like his father and other prominent Creek men, had two wives at a time during some of this period. He had a total of 20 children through these unions. His first wife was Elsie Otterlifter, a Cherokee. They had two daughters: Arseno, born about 1844 and Susanna, born about 1846.

His second wife was Jane Ward, who bore six children: Albert Gallatin (1848–1915), Lucy A. (1850–?), Freeland Buckner (1852–1914), Roley (Cub) (1858–?), Daniel N., Jr. (1862–1936) and Sarah Susanna McIntosh (1867–?).

While married to Ward, McIntosh practiced polygamy, taking another wife. He married and had several children with Winnie Canard McIntosh (1835–1922, Creek Dawes Roll#5228), a woman of African, Creek and Scots ancestry. Their children were Benjamin William, Cooper, Charles E., and Elizabeth "Lizzie" McIntosh.

After Jane died, McIntosh married Emma Belle Gawler in 1874 in Washington, D.C. They had eight children: Zolena, born 1873; Zenophen, born 1875; Etta, born 1878; Mondese, born 1880; Lulu Noka, born 1882; Waldo Emerson born c. 1885; William Yancey, born 1889; and Kaniah McIntosh, born 1892.

== Civil War service ==
At the outbreak of the Civil War, McIntosh organized and served as a colonel of the 1st Creek Mounted Volunteers (later known as the First Creek Cavalry Regiment, C.S.A.). Daniel's elder brother, Chilly McIntosh, organized and served as a colonel of the 2nd Creek Mounted Volunteers (later known as the Second Creek Cavalry Regiment, C.S.A.) which was under the administrative command of Daniel N. McIntosh. D.N. McIntosh was organizing the 3rd Creek Cavalry Regiment, C.S.A., which would have entitled him to the rank of brigadier general in the Confederate Army. But the war ended before he received that rank. Eight members of the McIntosh family served in Colonel McIntosh's regiment.

His regiment fought in the following battles: Round Mountain, Chusto-Talasah (Shoal Creek), Chustenahlah, Pea Ridge, Old Fort Wayne, Honey Springs and Cabin Creek. Colonel McIntosh's Regiment was one of General Stand Watie's units having the distinction of being one of the last Confederate military units to surrender to Union military forces on 23 June 1865 near Doaksville, Choctaw Nation, Indian Territory.

== Post-war life ==
After the war, McIntosh represented the Creek Nation as a delegate to negotiating and signing the Creek Treaty of 1866. The United States had required a new peace treaty since the Creek were allied with the Confederacy. It required that they emancipate all their slaves and offer those persons who wanted to stay in Creek territory full membership and rights in the tribe, including shares of land. McIntoch served frequently as a tribal delegate to Washington, D.C. He became a successful farmer, stockman and landholder. During his lifetime, he held every office in the tribe except Principal Chief of the Creek Nation.

McIntosh died on April 10, 1895, at his farm near Fame, Indian Territory. He was buried at Fame Cemetery not far from his home. This became part of McIntosh County, Oklahoma, after statehood.
