= Malcolm Mackintosh =

- Born: 25 December 1921
- Died: 20 November 2011 (aged 89)

John Malcolm Mackintosh, CMG, known as Malcolm Mackintosh, (25 December 1921 – 20 November 2011) was an intelligence analyst, civil servant, historian, Sovietologist, and author.

== Early life and war service ==
Mackintosh's father was dean of the London School of Hygiene & Tropical Medicine. He attended St. Mary's School, Melrose, Mill Hill School and Edinburgh Academy. At the outbreak of World War II in 1939 he was a first year student at Glasgow University when he was called up for officer training. Posted initially to Cairo, he was given parachute training in Palestine before being parachuted into Yugoslavia to join Tito's partisans as a member of the Special Operations Executive. In 1944 he was based in Sofia, acting as liaison officer to the Soviet forces occupying Bulgaria, and as a member of the Allied Control Commission. While in Sofia he met his wife, Lena Grafova, daughter of a White Russian exile; the couple married in 1946.

== Post-war years ==
Returning to the UK in 1946, Mackintosh resumed his studies at Glasgow, graduating with a first class degree in History and Russian in 1948. For the next 12 years he worked as a programme organiser in the BBC Overseas Service's Bulgarian and Albanian section. On graduating he had turned down the offer of a job with the Foreign Office, but he was employed by them as an interpreter in 1955 and 1956, when Marshal Bulganin and Nikita Khrushchev visited Britain.

In 1960 he joined the Foreign Office as an intelligence analyst. In 1968 he was appointed to the Cabinet Office as senior adviser on Soviet affairs. In 1973 he was a member of the delegation that visited the Soviet Union with foreign secretary Alec Douglas-Home, being described by Soviet officials as a falsifier of history - a description for which he received an apology after the collapse of the Soviet Union. He retired in 1987, amongst his final achievements having been as one of the advisers who persuaded Margaret Thatcher that it would be possible to "do business with" Mikhail Gorbachev.

In retirement he continued to lecture and write, and took up a number of academic appointments, including at St Andrew's University, King's College, London and the International Institute of Strategic Studies.

== Publications ==
- Khrushchev and the Soviet Army, 1958
- Strategy and Tactics of Soviet Foreign Policy, 1962
- Juggernaut: a History of the Soviet Armed Forces, 1967
- The Evolution of the Warsaw Pact, 1969
- Soviet Foreign Policy : Its Many Facets and Its Real Objectives (contrib), 1972
- The Middle East and the International System I. The Impact of the 1973 War (contrib), 1975
