= NeverSeconds =

Blog describing school meals

- Website type: Restaurant review of school meals
- Available in: English
- Owners: Martha Payne, father David Payne
- Creator: "VEG" an alias of Martha Payne
- Editor: David Payne
- Revenue: £145,812 via JustGiving to charity Mary's Meals
- Website: neverseconds.blogspot.co.uk
- Commercial: No
- Launched: 30 April 2012; 14 years ago
- Current status: Operational but not updated since 4 February 2014

NeverSeconds is a blog created and run by Scottish schoolgirl Martha Payne in 2012. On it, she expressed her thoughts and experiences of eating school meals at her primary school in Lochgilphead. The blog received a great deal of public attention and international press coverage after the Argyll and Bute Council tried to ban the child from posting photos of the lunchtime meals served at her school. After being used to help raise more than £143,000 of donations to the Mary's Meals charity via JustGiving in support of school feeding programmes for impoverished communities around the world, the blog ceased to be updated after less than two years of operation.

== Description ==
Launched on 30 April 2012 as a school writing project with assistance from Martha's father David, the blog is written under the pseudonym "VEG" (Veritas Ex Gustu – truth from tasting), with the subtitle "One primary school pupil's daily dose of school dinners". Much like a restaurant review, it features daily entries on the £2 school meal that Martha / "VEG" has chosen that day, her thoughts on the food and its quality, a count of the number of hairs, a health rating, a picture, and marks out of 10 based on a "Food-o-Meter".

Nine-year-old Martha's first full entry on 8 May 2012 featured a picture of a slice of pizza and a single potato croquette, alongside some sweetcorn and an unfrosted cupcake for dessert. Her written comment was: "The good thing about this blog is Dad understands why I am hungry when I get home. Today he made a Banana Loaf, shame I don't like bananas, see I am not perfect!"

The blog hit local and then national headlines, after gaining support from chef and school meals campaigner Jamie Oliver, who used social networking site X (Formerly Twitter), tweeting "Shocking but inspirational blog. Keep going, big love from Jamie x." The blog had gained 3 million hits by 15 June 2012. In February 2014 it reached 10 million. The resultant web traffic generated media interest, with Martha featuring as a guest on BBC Radio 4's You and Yours and later becoming the subject of an edition of Radio 4's The Food Programme. After NeverSeconds went viral, Martha's father met with the school council, which announced that all students would be allowed unlimited servings of fruit, vegetables, and bread.

With the consequential revenue, Martha decided to donate the money to the charity Mary's Meals. Starting with £50 given by a magazine for the publishing rights to her images, for a feature; Martha set an original target in her 19th blog post of £7,000 on JustGiving. By mid-June 2012 more than £90,000 had been raised, which the charity intends to use to build a new kitchen at the 1,963 pupil Lirangwe Primary School in Blantyre, Malawi.

== Banning by council ==
On 14 June 2012, the headteacher told Martha that she should no longer take photographs of her food inside the dining hall. The decision had come down from Argyll and Bute Council, who had become cautious of negative press reaction and the effect it was having on school meals staff. Of particular concern was an article in the Daily Record newspaper, which had published a photograph of Martha alongside chef Nick Nairn under the headline "Time to fire the dinner ladies". In response, Martha wrote an entry titled "Goodbye", explaining the council's decision, followed by a commentary from her father. Human rights group Big Brother Watch called the act "an authoritarian infringement on her civil liberties."

On 15 June, following a storm of protest on the internet, the council issued a press release defending the decision. However, after the intervention of local Scottish National Party MSP and Education Secretary Mike Russell, council leader Roddy McCuish told BBC Radio 4's World at One programme:

There's no place for censorship in Argyll and Bute Council and there never has been and there never will be. I've just instructed senior officials to immediately withdraw the ban on pictures from the school dining hall. It's a good thing to do, to change your mind, and I've certainly done that.

The ban was later cited as a "classic example of local government failing to grasp the power of social media", while BBC technology correspondent Rory Cellan-Jones jokingly called the ban "a brilliant scheme to put their region in the west of Scotland on the map." As a result of the controversy, Martha's Just Giving total rose from under £2,000 to more than £40,000 by the afternoon of 15 June, and to £65,000 the following day. By July it stood at £110,412. In November 2014, it was over £143,000. This was described as an example of the Streisand effect.

== Awards ==
Martha Payne has received several awards as a result of her blog:

- "Public Campaigner of the Year 2012" at the Scottish Politician of the Year awards run by Glasgow newspaper The Herald.
- "Human Rights Young Person of the Year" at the 2012 Liberty Awards.
- "Lidl Young Fundraiser of the Year 2013" at the Pride of Britain Awards 2013 Mirror.
