= Craig Lodge Community =

Coordinates: 56.40685°N 4.95265°W

Craig Lodge Community is a lay community of the Roman Catholic Church based in Dalmally, Argyll in the west Highlands of Scotland.

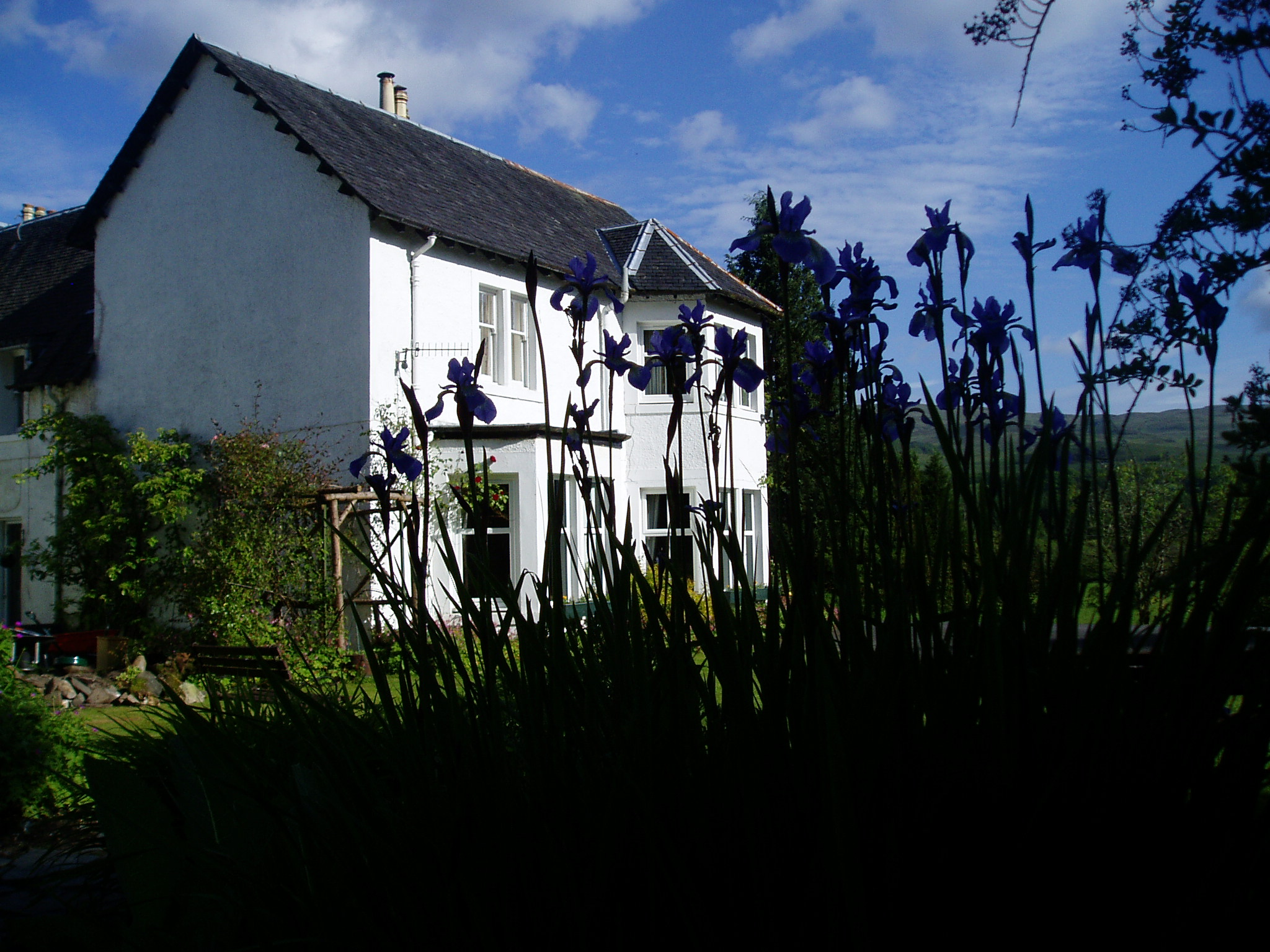
Craig Lodge Family House of Prayer

== History ==
Craig Lodge, a former hunting lodge in Dalmally, Argyll, Scotland, was run by Calum and Mary-Anne MacFarlane-Barrow as a guest house until a pilgrimage to Medjugorje in 1984. Their daughter Ruth read about the events at Medjugorje, and the reports that the Virgin Mary was appearing to six teenagers. Ruth and her brothers were intrigued with the idea something like this could happen in their own time and were determined to go and visit and find out more.

Their first visit to Medjugorje, a small village in Bosnia-Herzegovina, was a life-changing experience. The region was then still part of Communist Yugoslavia and to practice the Catholic faith often met with persecution. Seeing the deep faith of the local people and hearing about the extraordinary events first-hand left a lasting impression on the group. They also learnt about the messages the Virgin Mary, under the title, Queen of Peace, was giving through the visionaries. As in Lourdes and Fatima her message at Medjugorje continues to be a call to return to the gospel; to decide for God, to pray and to fast.

The family's experiences in Medjugorje paved the way for Calum and Mary-Anne taking the decision to turn their guest house into a House of Prayer. Visitors come to join in with organized retreats or just to enjoy the beautiful, peaceful surroundings and take part in the Community's daily prayer routine.

In 1990, Calum and Mary Anne invited a group of young people to form a youth community (named Krizevac Community) at Craig Lodge. The commitment was for one year and the purpose was to deepen their faith through living out the messages of Medjugorje. This programme ran until Covid-19.

In September 2021, the year for God was relaunched as the Mission House: a 9-month discipleship programme dedicated to prayer and mission.

“Dear Children my heart is full of grace and love. My heart is the gift I give you. Be united! Pray together! Love together!”

== The Community today ==
The Community soon began to get involved in evangelizing other young people through youth weekend retreats at Craig Lodge, visiting parishes and initiating prayer groups.

Ten years later in 2000, it was decided the Community should incorporate Permanent members too – families, single people or religious who choose to renew their commitment annually. This is Craig Lodge Community as it is today. While members of the House Community live in Craig Lodge itself and commit to one year, Permanent members live independently, in their own homes, close by to Craig Lodge. Their daily commitment is different to that of the House Community to take into account family and work responsibilities.

== The purpose of the Community ==
The purpose of the Community is to foster holiness in the members by living out the messages of the Virgin Mary at Medjugorje. Living in community has always been recognized as a way of progressing in the spiritual life. It is a way of finding companions on the journey of faith, of supporting each other and helps to open hearts to Jesus and to others. The understanding is that people are the pathway to the growth of virtue in each of us.
"Pray, pray, pray."

Daily Life
Prayer is integral to the daily life of the Community: Divine Office, the Rosary, Praise and Worship, Lectio Divina, Intercessory prayer particularly for priests. If prayer is the breath of the Community then the Eucharist is the heart. Daily life centres on the Holy Mass and Adoration of the Blessed Sacrament.

“Today I invite you all to fall in love with the Most Holy Sacrament of the Altar. Adore him, little children, in your parishes. In this way you will be united with the entire world. Jesus will become your friend and you will not talk of Him as someone you hardly know. Union with him will be a joy for you and you will become witnesses to Jesus’ love which he has for every creature. Little children when you adore Jesus you are also close to me.”

The overarching rule of the Community is to love:

Love each other deeply, because love covers a multitude of sins, offer hospitality to one another without grumbling. Each one should use whatever gifts he has received to serve others, faithfully administering God’s grace in its various forms 1 Peter 4: 8–11

Service
The Community's life has a strong calling to service. First and foremost by offering hospitality to the guests who come on retreat at Craig Lodge; by praying with them and making them feel at home. The Community is committed to youth work running several youth events each year at Craig Lodge – Easter, Summer and Advent. There is also an outreach team that carries out missions in secondary schools. The Community has a popular music ministry that leads the lively weekly praise and worship prayer group and is a hallmark of the Craig Lodge youth events. The Community is also eager to support family life and makes special efforts to make families welcome at Craig Lodge. Over the last years it has developed Family Week retreats that are geared to the needs of young families and include talks for parents alongside activities for the children. The patron saints of Craig Lodge Community are: Our Lady Queen of Peace, Saint Joseph, Saint Therese of Lisieux and Saint Francis.

== Craig Lodge Family House of Prayer ==
Retreats
As a Roman Catholic retreat centre, Craig Lodge has a wide variety of retreats throughout the year. They cover topics such as: healing, Scripture, Theology of the Body, Pope John Paul II, Ignatius Spiritual Exercises and fasting.

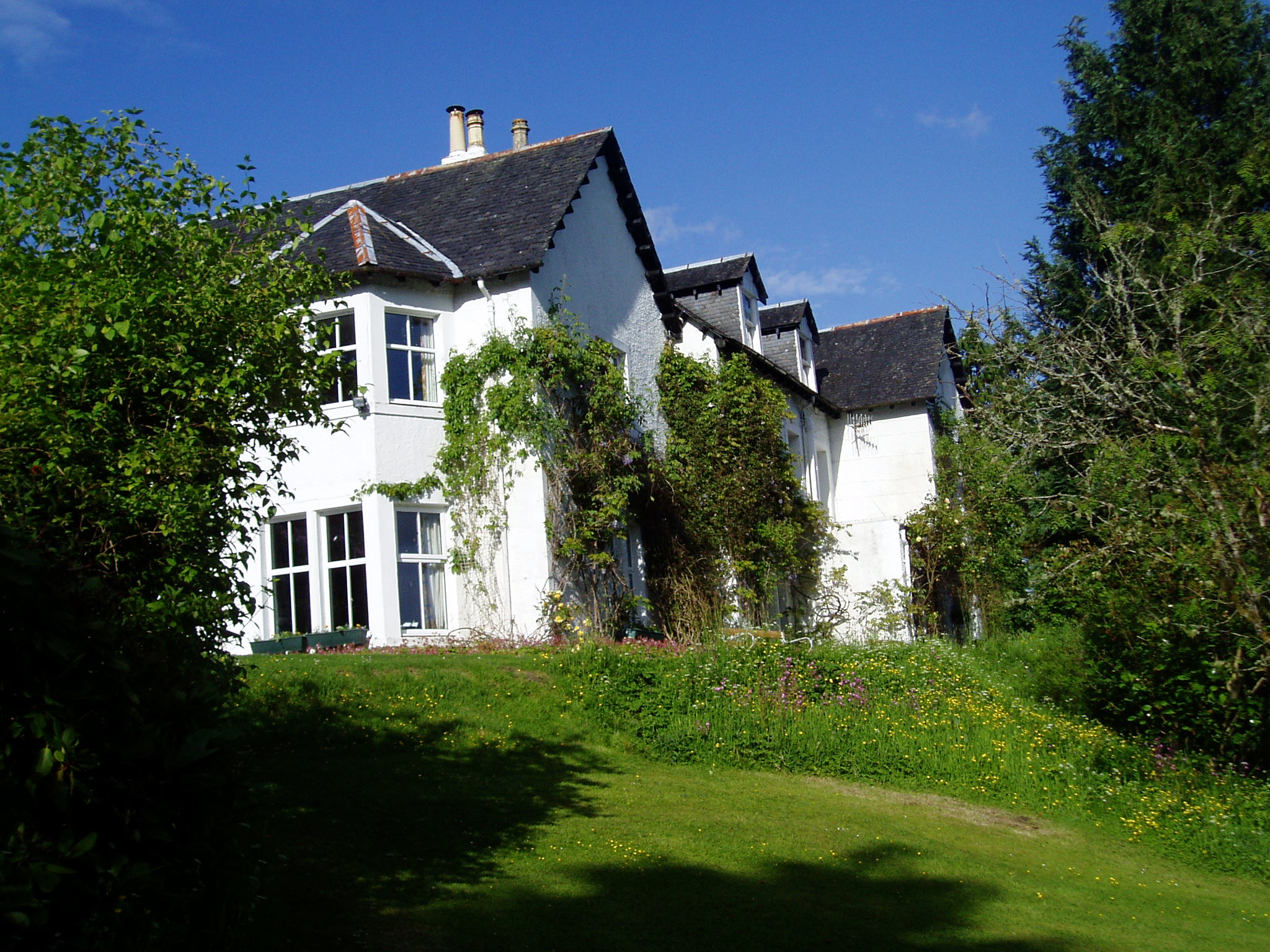
The gardens at Craig Lodge

Way of the Cross
Visitors to Craig Lodge can make A Way of the Cross, marked out with cairns of stone for each Station, on the hill behind Craig Lodge.

== Mary's Meals ==
The international aid charity Mary's Meals has its headquarters in the grounds of Craig Lodge. Magnus MacFarlane-Barrow OBE (Order of the British Empire), the founder and chief executive of Mary's Meals, is based at Craig Lodge.
