= Human Dignity Award =

Irish award

The Human Dignity Award is an award made by the All-Party Oireachtas Life and Dignity Group, recognising people who have contributed to human dignity. The award was set up in 2014 by Senator Rónán Mullen.

It was originally awarded by the Human Dignity Group, which was founded in 2008 by Mullen. In January 2021, the All-Party Oireachtas Life and Dignity Group, which is co-chaired by TDs Peter Fitzpatrick and Carol Nolan, was established, on whose behalf the award is now awarded. It is presented annually by the Ceann Comhairle of Dáil Éireann (the lower chamber of the Oireachtas) or by the Cathaoirleach of Seanad Éireann (the Upper house of the Oireachtas).

== Recipients ==
- 2014 – Magnus MacFarlane-Barrow, founder of Mary's Meals in Malawi
- 2015 – Barney Curley, founder of Direct Aid For Africa
- 2016 – Gena Heraty, volunteer worker who runs 'Our Little Brothers and Sisters Orphanage' in Haiti
- 2018 – Br. Kevin Crowley and the Capuchin Day Centre
- 2019 – Sister Consilio and Cuan Mhuire
- 2022 – Ronan Scully, volunteer worker with Self Help Africa and GOAL.
- 2023 – Sr. Catherine Lillis, founder of the addiction rehabilitation centre,Tabor House.
