= Pearl Phelan =

Irish nurse

Sr Joseph Ignatius

Personal life
- Born: Pearl Phelan; 11 February 1921 Clonmel, Co Tipperary, Ireland
- Died: 4 December 2010 (aged 91) Our Lady's Hospice, Dublin, Ireland
- Known for: Hospice care pioneer

Religious life
- Religion: Roman Catholic
- Order: Religious Sisters of Charity
- Movement: Hospice movement

Senior posting
- Awards: People of the Year 1987

Pearl Phelan, Sr Joseph Ignatius (11 February 1921 – 4 December 2010) was a nurse and pioneer of person-centred hospice care, known to many as "Aunt Pearl". In her role at Our Lady's Hospice in Harold's Cross, Dublin, she modernised the facility and transformed end-of-life and palliative care. She introduced the hospice Home Care service so people could die in their own homes. For her initiatives in enabling people to "live life to the full, control their symptoms so they are freed from pain and fear of pain", she received the People of the Year Award in 1987.

== Early life and family ==
Phelan was born on 11 February 1921 to John Bernard and Mary Agnes Phelan in Clonmel, Co Tipperary where her family owned the Clonmel Drapery Company. She was the third of six children, Kitty, Ellie, Maura, Michael and John. Her brother John died when she was 10 and she was orphaned at the age of 13.

Her sister Maura married James Dillon TD. The author Liz Nugent is Phelan's grand niece.

== Career ==
Phelan trained as nurse before entering the Irish Sisters of Charity as a novice at the relatively late age of 31. She entered religious life with the Order at St Anne's in Milltown on 30 June 1952, becoming Sr Joseph Ignatius.

She became head of theatre nursing at St Vincent's Hospital on St Stephen's Green, Dublin, where she oversaw their design and move to the hospital's current location in Elm Park in 1970.

Her Mother Superior, Sr. Francis Rose O'Flynn, transferred her to Our Lady's Hospice, where she was tasked with transforming end of life and palliative care. Phelan studied best practice in hospice care in the UK and US. She went to Hackney in the mid-70s to learn more about terminal pain management. There she met and befriended Dame Cicely Saunders, founder of the hospice movement, who became her mentor.

She successfully applied for funding from the Department of Health to extend and modernise the hospice building. She extended it to provide a 17-bed unit for acute terminally ill patients. It was completed in 1978 at a cost of £110,000. The hospice combined the "competence and skill of a general hospital with the warmth of a home".

Phelan was showing visitors from Minnesota, who wanted to set up a similar hospice in the US, around Our Lady's Hospice when they asked a patient called Lily what made the hospice special. Lily replied "Stella there likes her tea cool and weak, I like mine hot and strong. And that's the way we get it." When Abba played their only Irish gig in Dublin in 1979, there was a teenage fan in the hospice who wanted to go but there were no tickets available. So Phelan rang their hotel and managed to secure a front-row ticket for her.

Film-maker Alan Gilsenan, who made a documentary series called The Hospice in 2007, recalled his mother, a childhood friend and cousin of Phelan's, "going to Pearl" for the last two weeks of her life. He described Phelan's "strong sense of sheer goodness".

=== Hospice Home Care ===
In 1985, Phelan spearheaded the introduction of the hospice Home Care scheme, to facilitate pain-controlled, end-of-life care in people's own homes. The service operated 24 hours a day, with members of the hospice team visiting people dying of cancer at home "to help them live life to the full while they are with us and assist their families to go on living afterwards".

=== Award ===
In 1987, a People of the Year Award, then sponsored by the Rehab Institute and New Ireland Assurance, was presented to Sr. Ignatius Phelan and her Mother Superior Sr. Francis Rose O'Flynn. They were honoured for their "outstanding work with the terminally ill at Our Lady's Hospice and the support they gave to families through home visits". The citation for the award described their achievements as "a modern day miracle".

== Death and legacy ==
Phelan died at her home in Our Lady's Hospice, Dublin on 4 December 2010, aged 89. She was surrounded by members of her family and religious community. At her eulogy, her nephew John Blake Dillon described her leadership style as summed up by Lao Tzu; "As for the best leaders – the people do not notice their existence."

Phelan was featured in the 2022 book Her Keys to the city, in which 80 women were retrospectively honoured for their contributions to Dublin. The book was commissioned by then Lord Mayor Alison Gilliland to address the imbalance of those who had been awarded the Freedom of the City of Dublin since 1876 – 83 men and four women.
