= Yes I Can (TV programme) =

Irish television series

Yes I Can is a 4-part documentary series created for Setanta Sports. by beActive Media, with support from the Broadcasting Authority of Ireland. It features four people overcoming various disabilities and attempting an extreme sport. The featured participants are given the chance to engage in radical experiences, from car racing to waterskiing, and encourage other people not to let any disability stop them from living life to the full. It aired for four consecutive Mondays in November 2011 on Setanta Sports.

== Episodes ==
Each episode opens with an introduction by Mark Pollock to his story and the participant's story. The first half of each episode introduces the participant while the second half follows them as they attempt their challenge and strive to achieve their goals.

=== Episode 1 ===
Emma Levey has struggled with her confidence for a long time. She has spent most of her life in a wheelchair due to her spina bifida, and since the passing of her parents, she has had to adapt to living on her own. Her sister and cousins talk about the obstacles Emma has overcome in her life and their hopes for what she can gain from this experience. Emma decides to attempt the Zip-line and Fan drop for her challenge.

=== Episode 2 ===
Simon Jameson, who has muscular dystrophy, has spent five years trying to adapt a wheelchair to enable him to play airsoft. This game, where players engage in battles using replica weapons, was never meant for someone in a wheelchair. Simon wants to prove it can be done, and with the support of his parents Joe and Ita he has managed to design and build a suitable chair. His brother Edward was a huge supporter of Simon's dream but died two years ago. Simon's family explain how much this project means to Simon and how much work has gone into it. We learn about muscular dystrophy and the effect it has.

=== Episode 3 ===
Emma Doyle has spent her life exceeding expectations. She was born with a rare condition called Hereditary spastic paraplegia which is similar to cerebral palsy. Her family and friends explain how Emma was told she would never walk but now uses just a crutch to get around. She has a fear of water but has learned to swim and now wants to attempt something even more difficult – waterskiing. Emma shares her hopes with us and says that she wants to discover her own limitations, not have them set for her by others. She visits IASC, a manmade lake built by World disabled Waterski Champion Eamonn Prunty.

=== Episode 4 ===
Mark Talbot lost his sight to meningitis in 2008. He and his wife Sirpa talk candidly about the impact this has had on their lives. He tells us of his struggles with his guide dog and his own fears as he tries to rebuild his life. Mark is a former motorbike racer and photographer, and friends speak of the support he got from the racing community, as well as his employers and the travel Assist programme at Dublin Bus. Mark wants to recapture the buzz he once thrived on. He wants to revisit Mondello and drive its track. Instructor Philip at the racecourse takes on the task of teaching Mark how to around the track in a Mazda racecar.
