= Queva Griffin =

Irish poet

Queva Griffin (10 August 1983 – 2003) was an Irish poet with cystic fibrosis. Griffin was a double organ recipient, the first person under 25 to survive a heart-lung double transplant. She published a book of poetry as a fundraiser for the costs associated with her illness. She was named Young Person of the Year in 1998 for her courage during the transplant process. She died in 2003, after picking up an infection.

== Works ==
- The Light:A collection of poems, 1996
