= Oban South and the Isles (ward) =

Electoral ward in Argyll and Bute, Scotland

Location of the ward

Oban South and the Isles is one of the eleven wards used to elect members of the Argyll and Bute Council. It elects four Councillors.

== Councillors ==
Election	Councillors			
2007	Gordon Chalmers (Ind.)	Mary-Jean Devon (Liberal Democrats /SNP /Ind.)	Roddy McCuish (SNP/ Ind./ ISP)	Donald Skye McIntosh (SNP)
2012	Alistair MacDougall (Ind.)	Mary-Jean Devon (Liberal Democrats /SNP /Ind.)	Roddy McCuish (SNP/ Ind./ ISP)	Fred Hall (SNP)
2017	Jamie McGrigor (Conservative)	Mary-Jean Devon (Liberal Democrats /SNP /Ind.)	Roddy McCuish (SNP/ Ind./ ISP)	Jim Linch (SNP)
2021	Jamie McGrigor (Conservative)	Mary-Jean Devon (Liberal Democrats /SNP /Ind.)	Roddy McCuish (SNP/ Ind./ ISP)	Jim Linch (SNP)
2022	Amanda Hampsey (Conservative)	Andrew Kane (Ind.)	Willie Hume (SNP)	Jim Linch (SNP)

== Election results ==
=== 2022 election ===
Oban South and the Isles − 4 seats
Party	Candidate	FPv%	Count									
Party	Candidate	FPv%	1	2	3	4	5	6	7	8	9	10
SNP	Jim Lynch (incumbent)	21.3	773									
SNP	Willie Hume	16.9	615	645	648	657	667	705	724	777		
Conservative	Amanda Hampsey	12.4	452	452	460	479	522	538	601	645	646	667
Green	Phyl Stuart Meyer	9.7	353	357	368	392	401	436	491	520	539	
Independent	Andrew Kane	8.1	295	295	304	314	354	393	439	529	540	698
Independent	Colin Kennedy	7.0	256	257	269	276	309	378	405			
Independent	Donnie Campbell	6.5	235	235	247	257	280					
Liberal Democrats	Henry Drummond Boswell	5.2	188	188	197	255	282	302				
Independent	Jamie McGrigor (incumbent)	4.9	179	180	214	226						
Labour	Gopi Ageer	4.7	169	169	176							
Independent	John Watson	3.2	118	120								
Electorate: 8,092 Valid: 3,633 Spoilt: 62 Quota: 727 Turnout: 45.7%

=== 2017 election ===
2017 Argyll and Bute Council election

Oban South and the Isles - 4 seats
Party	Candidate	FPv%	Count						
Party	Candidate	FPv%	1	2	3	4	5	6	7
Independent	Roddy McCuish (incumbent)	21.12	808						
Independent	Mary-Jean Devon (incumbent)	19.19	734	744.1	789.8				
Conservative	Jamie McGrigor	16.44	629	636.3	667.9	671.0	712.5	759.0	770.0
SNP	Jim Lynch	16.03	613	616.7	619.8	623.0	637.4	680.0	1164.3
SNP	Sean MacIntyre	13.22	506	511.5	519.5	520.9	539.1	572.7	
Labour	Jake Ainscough	5.91	226	229.0	257.5	259.8	276.8		
Independent	Alistair MacDougall (incumbent)	4.05	155	158.2	169.5	179.3			
Liberal Democrats	David Pollard	4.03	154	156.4					
Electorate: Valid: 3,825 Spoilt: 66 Quota: 766 Turnout: 3,891 (47.5%)

=== 2012 election ===
2012 Argyll and Bute Council election

Oban South and the Isles - 4 seats
Party	Candidate	FPv%	Count							
Party	Candidate	FPv%	1	2	3	4	5	6	7	8
SNP	Mary-Jean Devon (incumbent)	24.67%	830							
SNP	Roddy McCuish (incumbent)	22.79%	767							
SNP	Fred Hall†	10.37%	349	408.6	461.6	475.2	489.6	523.2	569	632.6
Independent	Alistair MacDougall	8.35%	281	305.4	307.9	333.8	373.4	406	580.9	701.5
Independent	Gordon Chalmers (incumbent)	7.99%	269	305.1	307.1	329.7	370.5	386.2		
Independent	Neil MacKinnon MacIntyre	7.64%	257	260.4	273.9	291.1	327.4	442.7	483.7	
Independent	Sean MacIntyre	7.04%	237	239.8	248.4	266.7	283.9			
Conservative	Michael Hawke	5.68%	191	194	196.4	252.2				
Liberal Democrats	Graham Kanes	5.47%	184	189.5	191.6					
Electorate: 7,615 Valid: 3,365 Spoilt: 51 Quota: 674 Turnout: 3,416 (44.19%)

=== 2007 Election ===
2007 Argyll and Bute Council election

Oban South and the Isles
Party	Candidate	FPv%	%	Seat	Count
SNP	Roddy McCuish	955	23.3	1	1
Liberal Democrats	Mary-Jean Devon†	672	16.4	2	5
SNP	Donald Skye McIntosh††††	506	12.4	3	9
Independent	Gordon Chalmers	444	10.9	4	9
Conservative	Roy Rutherford	413	10.1		
Independent	Alastair MacDougall	347	8.5		
Liberal Democrats	Nicola Welsh	293	7.2		
Independent	Neil MacKinnon MacIntyre	290	7.1		
Independent	Roderick MacEachen	143	3.5		
Independent	David Gallant	27	0.7		
