= Tomi Reichental =

Slovak-Irish Holocaust survivor (1935–2026)

Tomi Reichental BEM
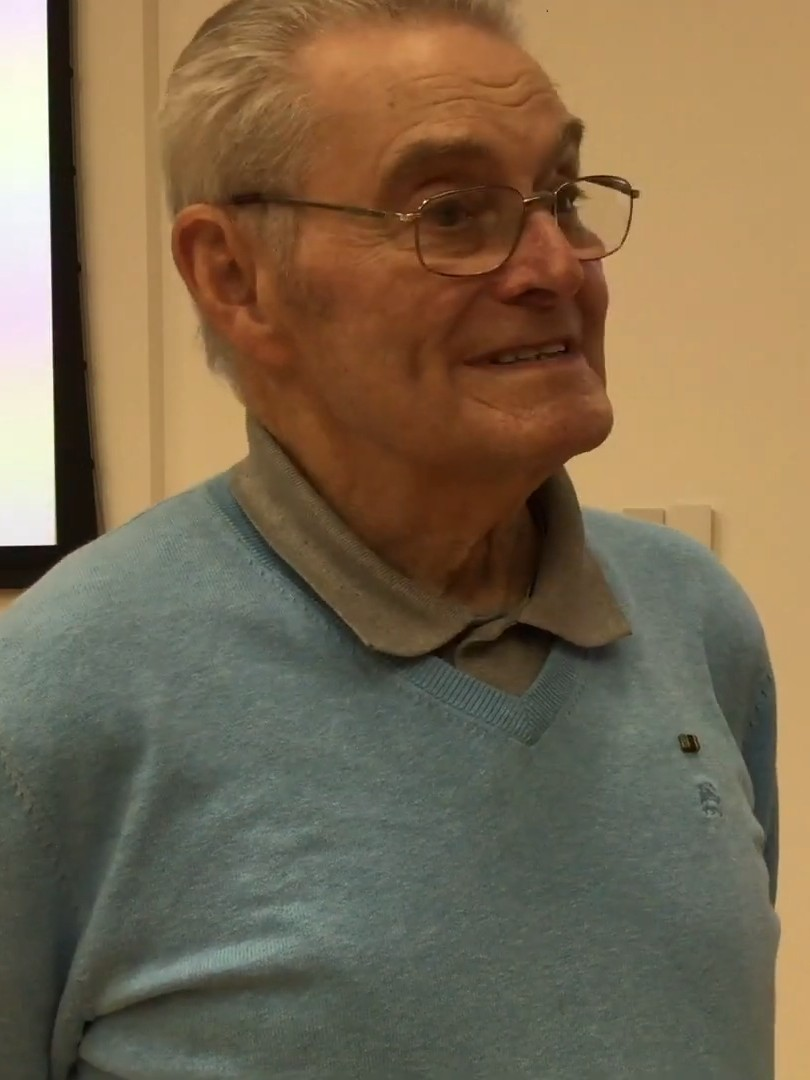
- Reichental in 2019
- Born: Tomáš Reichental; June 1935; Merašice, Czechoslovakia
- Died: May 2026 (aged 90)
- Known for: Holocaust survivor
- Children: 3
- Awards: Order of Merit of the Federal Republic of Germany (2013); People of the Year Award (2014); Maynooth University Honorary Doctorate (2015); Bar of Ireland Human Rights Award (2019); British Empire Medal (2023)

Tomáš Reichental (June 1935 – May 2026) was a Slovak-born Irish Holocaust survivor. He moved to Ireland in the 1950s and, later in life, wrote and spoke about his experiences at Bergen-Belsen concentration camp.

== Early life ==
Reichental was born in Merašice, Czechoslovakia (today Slovakia), in June 1935, to Jewish farmers and lived with his family on their farm until he was the age of eight. When laws were introduced which prohibited the movement and rights of Jewish people, he and his family went into hiding. He, his mother, his brother, and his grandmother were caught and taken to Bergen-Belsen concentration camp in 1944 where they remained until the camp was liberated by the British in 1945. More than 30 members of his family were killed during the Holocaust.

== Later life and advocacy ==
Reichental briefly returned to Czechoslovakia before emigrating to Israel in 1949. He served in the Israeli Army starting in 1953 and trained as an engineer. He moved to Ireland in 1959, and lived with his family in Dublin. Reichental became an Irish citizen in 1977.

While he did not speak about his experiences for half a century, Reichental later became known for his talks about his experience of the Holocaust as a child. From 2000 onwards, he gave talks in secondary schools, colleges and at events across the island of Ireland. His stated aim was to educate people about what happened during the Holocaust so that the people who died in it are remembered and so it never happens again:

After all the horror, I am doing my best to keep the memory of those lost ones alive. We—you, me, your children, my children—must never forget[.]

In 2007, Reichental was approached by Gerry Gregg, Seamus Deasy and Oliver Donohoe about making a film about him and his experiences in Bergen-Belsen. He agreed, and in late 2007, they traveled to Germany to film Reichental talking about his experiences in the concentration camp, while standing where it once stood. In the documentary, titled Close to Evil, Reichental requested an interview with former SS guard Hilde Michnia. While she declined an interview with Reichental, she did appear in the documentary. This led to Hans-Jürgen Brennecke, a Hamburg prosecutor, filing charges against her as she was suspected of participating in the forcing of prisoners on an evacuation march in which 1,400 women died in 1945. While attempting to meet with Michnia, Reichental had hoped to find signs of atonement and said he had been open to the idea that she was possibly a "different person to the young woman who was convicted of war crimes in 1945". However, she declined to meet with him and denied any personal responsibility in the Holocaust. About this, Reichental said:

That I did not meet Hilde was not the big letdown, but rather the fact that Hilde is still stuck in the 1940s, this is what disappointed me.

As Jews we have a tradition of atonement, it is a rich and noble concept. I am not a rabbi, nor am I a very observant Jew. But I am a product of my background and, for me, I understand atonement as a person's effort to acquire a new heart and a new spirit.

Atonement, as I see it, is about repentance and reparation. Hilde had no interest in any of this. By her action of not meeting, in denying the murder of inmates in Bergen-Belsen, she has chosen to justify and distort her own role during the Third Reich.

In 2011, Reichental's book I Was a Boy in Belsen was published by The O'Brien Press. In this autobiography, Reichental recounts his experiences as a child prisoner in the Bergen-Belsen camp. A version of the book, for younger readers, was published by O'Brien Press in 2017.

As of 2014, he was one of three Holocaust survivors residing in Ireland. Reichental, who celebrated his 80th birthday in Blanchardstown mosque, reportedly advocated that Ireland accept additional refugees from Syria during a period of escalation in the Syrian civil war in late 2015. He received several awards for his efforts to promote tolerance and to educate young people about the importance of remembrance and reconciliation. In 2015, Trinity College Dublin awarded him an honorary doctorate. He was also conferred an honorary doctorate by Dublin City University (DCU) in March 2016. Citing his advocacy at that time, a representative of DCU stated:

In the past number of years Tomi Reichental has proven to be one of the most inspirational figures in modern Ireland. His effort to ensure that the important themes of remembrance, forgiveness, conflict resolution and reconciliation remain to the forefront of modern Irish thought is truly important. In an age where we see horrific pictures of refugees attempting to flee appalling regimes to find sanctuary in the West, Tomi Reichental is a vivid example of the positive impact refugees make to modern Irish society.

A further documentary involving Reichental, directed by Gerry Gregg and titled Condemned to Remember, was released in 2017.

In 2019, the Bar Council of Ireland awarded Reichental a Human Rights Award in recognition of his work promoting tolerance, remembrance and reconciliation. At that time, he was one of the last two Holocaust survivors living in Ireland.

He was awarded the British Empire Medal in the 2023 Special Honours "for services to [H]olocaust education, awareness and commemoration".

== Death and legacy ==
Reichental died in May 2026, aged 90. Tributes to Reichental were led by the President of Ireland Catherine Connolly, Taoiseach Micheál Martin and by members of the Irish Muslim Council and the Jewish Representative Council of Ireland.

== Autobiographical works ==
- Reichental, Tomi (2011). I Was a Boy in Belsen. O'Brien Press. ISBN 9781847172273.
- Reichental, Tomi; Massey, Eithne (2017). Tomi: Tomi Reichental's Holocaust Story. O'Brien Press. ISBN 9781847179753.
