= Sister Consilio =

Irish nun who set up Cuan Mhuire (born 1937)

Sr. Consilio Fitzgerald MBE
- Title: Sister

Personal life
- Born: 9 January 1937 (age 89) Brosna, County Kerry

Religious life
- Religion: Roman Catholic
- Order: Sisters of Mercy

Sr Consilio 'Eileen' Fitzgerald (born 9 January 1937) is an Irish nun who set up Cuan Mhuire, a charitable drug, alcohol and gambling rehabilitation organisation in Ireland. Among the awards which she has accepted for the organisation, in 2011 she was awarded an honorary MBE by Queen Elizabeth II in recognition of her lifelong work in helping individuals and families suffering from alcoholism and other addictions.

== Biography ==
=== Childhood ===
Eileen Fitzgerald, who is better known as Sr. Consilio of Cuan Mhuire, was born on 9 January 1937. She was the fifth child of three brothers and three sisters, born to Maurice and Mary Agnes Fitzgerald. Sr. Consilio was raised on a farm in Clougvoula, Brosna, County Kerry. Sr. Consilio went to secondary school in at the Convent of Mercy in Abbeyfeale.

=== Nursing ===
After completing her leaving certificate, she began training as a nurse in the North Infirmary Hospital in Cork. The hospital was run by The Sisters of Charity.

The Sisters of Charity encouraged their nurses to do visitations of the sick or needy on Gurranabraher—a local housing estate. The nurses who chose to do so, went in pairs and were easily recognisable in their navy uniform coats. Sr. Consilio spent most of her off duty in Gurranabraher where she got to know and love the people. Years later when she was doing her midwifery in St. Finbarr's Hospital, Cork she found herself once more in Gurranabraher – this time in the capacity of a midwife.

=== Joining the nuns ===
Upon completion of Consilio's training as a nurse, she took steps to answer her calling in life. Consilio joined the Sisters of Mercy, in Athy, County Kildare, on 8 September 1959.

As part of Consilio's training as a nun she taught second standard in the Primary School. In her second year she taught infant boys and fifth standard. She also got her first taste of work in St. Vincent's Hospital, Athy. The Matron Sr. Dominic, was her mentor.

=== Awakening of concern for the homeless and addicted ===
During Consilio's time working in St. Vincent's Hospital, Athy, she came in contact with, and befriended, many "men of the road"—those men of no fixed abode who went from county home to county home, and found temporary lodgings in a little house at the bottom of the garden at St. Vincent's. They got their meals at a side table in the main dining room. She would come to know these men well from her work in the kitchen; she also looked after their sleeping accommodation and chatted with them at nighttime. In her own words she said

I was interested in them and found them to be intelligent, often well-educated people. Some of them had even changed their names as they didn't want to be recognised—they were so ashamed of their lifestyle. I often talked to them about their families and encouraged them to write home, particularly if their mothers were alive. I often thought how my mother would worry if a brother of mine were in a similar position. As time went on I began to realize more and more that these people were my brothers, and I said to myself: ‘Some day, somewhere, somehow, I will have a place that these people can call home

=== Cuan Mhuire ===
In 1965 she convinced the nuns in Athy to convert the dairy of the convent into a 'drop in' centre, where she could greet her visitors and listen to their troubles. This dairy became the focal point of Sr. Consilio's work with the homeless and the addicts. By this time, a few tradesmen had begun to recover from their addiction and they set to work on the dairy. Thus a functioning unit began. In 1965 Consilio founded Cuan Mhuire and dedicated her life to the work of the charity.

In November 1972, a farm of land came up for sale just outside Athy. Consilio, encouraged by the support of her Mother superior, paid a visit to the local bank manager. He asked Consilio how she would pay for it. She told him that "Our Lady would provide". Consilio attended the auction in full nun regalia and she came away from the auction with a forty-two-acre field and no way to pay for it. The bank manager asked Consilio how she managed to pay for the land, she simply replied: “Our Lady helped me”.

== Recognition of Work ==
Consilio has accepted awards or nomination on behalf of Cuan Mhuire. The awards include:

- 1975 Nurse of the Year, in recognition of her work and professionalism.
- 1977 Received a civic reception by the Lord Mayor of Galway and nominated as one of the "People of the Year".
- 1993 Nominated for Dublin Lord Mayor Awards and was placed on Dublin's civic honours list.
- 1996 Kerry Person of the Year.
- 1997 Athy Person of the Year.
- 1999 Conferred with Honorary Life Membership of the Royal Dublin Society.
- 1999 Winner of the Irish Sun "Sunshine Person of the Year".
- 1999 Hall of Fame Award – also awarded to the members of the Fitzgerald family who have worked for Cuan Mhuire, in particular, her brother Johnny Fitzgerald and her sister, Sr Agnes, who works in Cuan Mhuire, Bruree, County Limerick.
- 2000 Honorary Fellowship of the Faculty of Nursing and Midwifery at the Royal College of Surgeons.
- 2002 Honorary Fellow Waterford Institute of Technology in recognition of Sister Consilio's dedication to improving the life of others.
- 2003 Voted, by Radio Kerry listeners, "The Greatest Kerry Person of All Time"
- 2003 Awarded Duhallow Person of the Year.
- 2010 CHKS international quality improvement award for 2010.
- 2011 Sr. Consilio was awarded an honorary MBE by the Queen of the United Kingdom in recognition of her lifelong work in helping individuals and families suffering from alcoholism and other addictions.
- 2019 Sr.Consilio and Cuan Mhuire awarded the Irish government's Human Dignity Award.

== See also ==
- Cuan Mhuire
