= Mark Pollock =

Irish athlete (born 1976)

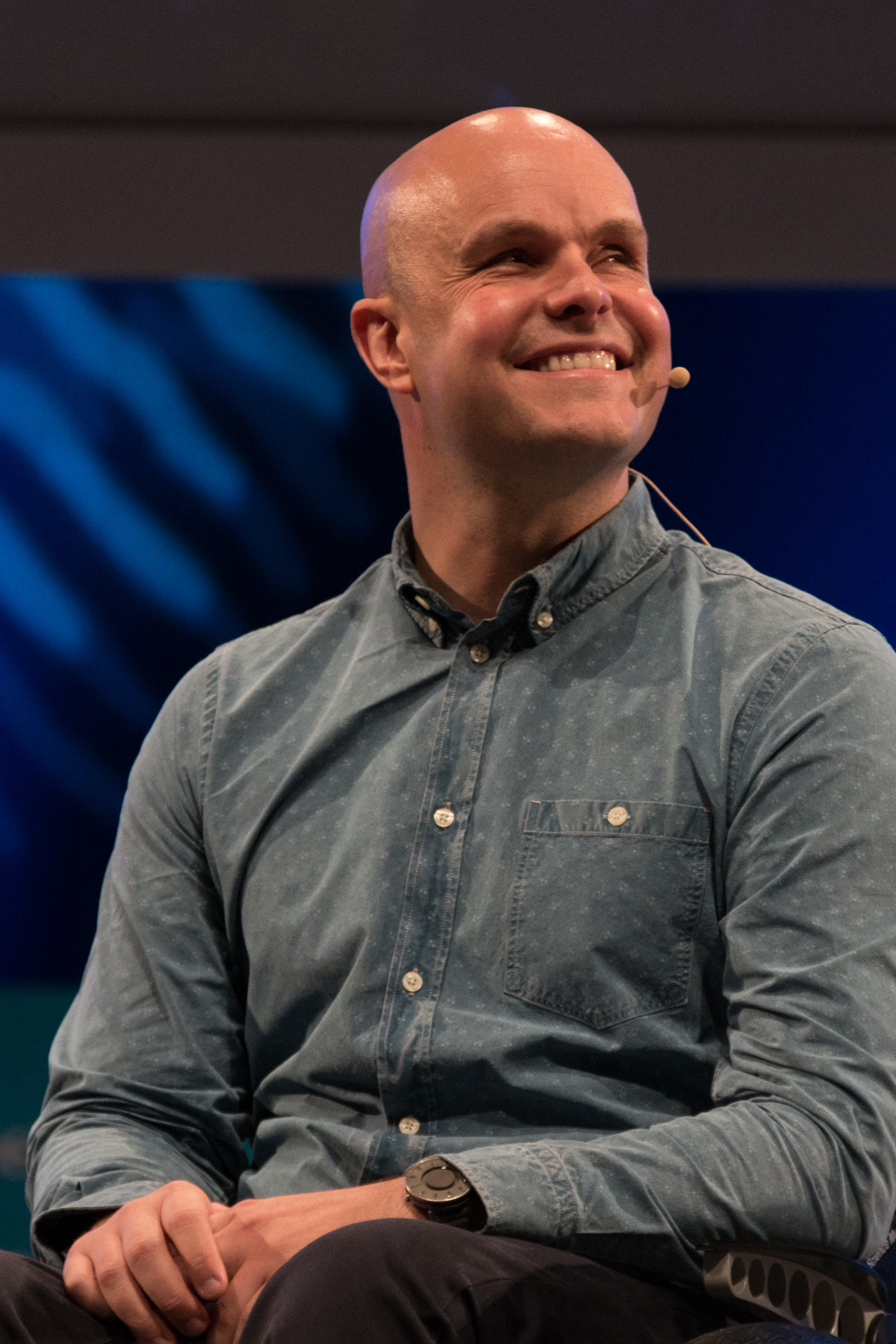
- Mark Pollock at the 2014 One Young World Conference
- Born: 29 February 1976 (age 50); Ireland
- Education: Royal Belfast Academical Institution; University College Dublin; Trinity College Dublin
- Occupations: Motivational speaker, explorer, and author
- Parent(s): Barbara and Johnny
- Awards: People of the Year Award; UCD Alumnus of the Year in Business

Mark Pollock
Medal record

Commonwealth Rowing Championships

Representing Northern Ireland
Bronze medal – third place	2002 Nottingham	Rowing
Silver medal – second place	2002 Nottingham	Rowing

Mark Pollock (born 29 February 1976) is an international motivational speaker, explorer, and author from Ireland who became the first blind man to race to the South Pole. As part of a three-man team called South Pole Flag, alongside Simon O'Donnell and Inge Solheim, he took 43 days in January 2009 to complete the Amundsen Omega 3 South Pole Race. They finished fifth overall from the six teams that finished the race, but Pollock asserted his disability had slowed him down. He had participated against nine other teams, including that of BBC personality Ben Fogle and the Olympic gold medallist James Cracknell, a friend of Pollock. Pollock has won bronze and silver medals at the 2002 Commonwealth Rowing Championships in Nottingham, England and has also written a book titled Making It Happen. Around 2020, he was involved in the creation of Collaborative Cures.

== Early life and background ==
Pollock was born to Barbara and Johnny in Holywood, County Down. When Mark was five, he lost the sight of his right eye and was forced during the remainder of his childhood to avoid contact team sports to preserve the vision in his left eye. He was educated at the Royal Belfast Academical Institution where he participated as a rower. In 2002, Pollock graduated from University College Dublin with a Masters of Business Studies. He later studied Business and Economics in Trinity College Dublin, where he became a champion schools rower and captain of the university's rowing club but aged 22 he lost the sight in his left eye, resulting in total blindness. In 2010, just weeks before his wedding, Pollock fell from an upstairs window, breaking his back and fracturing his skull. This caused bleeding on the brain and resulted in paralysis.

== Blindness ==
"I just wanted to be independent again. I started to get the tools that might help me: my computer; my speaking clock; my watch; Larry, my guide dog".

— Pollock on his search for independence.

Pollock has been blind since the age of twenty-two when his left retina became detached. At the time, he felt this would prevent him from working or participating in social environments. Before his operation, he had been about to embark on a city job in London, UK. After the onset of his blindness, he returned home to his mother.

"They didn't know how to cope with a blind person, and I couldn't tell them how it would work, because I had never worked as a blind person. It was a Catch-22.”

— Pollock on his search for employment.

Pollock enrolled in a course to help come to terms with his disability. He left for Dublin with his guide dog Larry and began putting himself forward for job interviews. Prospective employers were uncertain as to how to approach him. Eventually the father of one of his college friends assigned him to organising corporate entertainment. He returned to rowing and won bronze and silver medals for Northern Ireland in the 2002 Commonwealth Rowing Championships. He engaged in other athletic pursuits, including running six marathons in seven days with a sighted partner across the Gobi Desert, China in 2003 when he raised tens of thousands of euro for the charity Sightsavers International. On 10 April 2004, he competed in the North Pole Marathon on the sixth anniversary of his blindness.

To mark the 10th anniversary of his blindness, Pollock explored the challenge of racing to the South Pole.

Uncertain over whether to make the trip to the South Pole and concerned over the impact of sastrugi on his blindness, Pollock consulted with the explorer Pat Falvey who had completed the journey eighteen months previously.

Pollock wrote Making It Happen to detail his activities after becoming blind, including running marathons, establishing his own business, and becoming a public speaker.

== South Pole trek ==
Pollock travelled to the South Pole in January 2009. The trek cost Pollock around €250,000. His training included spending time in Norway to acclimatise himself to the sastrugi. Pollock, O'Donnell and Solheim travelled 770 kilometres, averaging fourteen hours journey time each day, while lugging 90 kilo sleds behind them. He pulled a 200lb sled for at least twelve hours each day, for a consecutive forty-three days. Temperatures dropped as low as −50C during the expedition, with the team experiencing blisters, hunger and extreme exhaustion. O'Donnell endured severe frostbite on one ear and fingers, and Solheim lost a filling from his tooth due to the extreme temperatures. Pollock told the Irish Independent that they "just can't believe" they had arrived and that they "only started to believe it was possible when we were one hour away, which was an amazing feeling". He described how they did not know what to do when they arrived, describing "such a burst of energy" that had engulfed them.

Pollock returned to Ireland on a 3 February 2009 where he was greeted at Dublin Airport, having been delayed by the extreme weather conditions which gripped Dublin that week.

== Television ==
On 7 February 2009, Pollock appeared on the RTÉ One chat show Tubridy Tonight. He hosted the documentary series Yes I Can which aired in November 2011 on Setanta Sports.

== Paralysis ==
In July 2010, Mark fell from a second storey window. He broke his back and was left paralysed. He has sought spinal cord injury recovery through aggressive physical therapy and robotic technology.

Pollock has embarked on an experimental treatment in an effort to overcome his paralysis in cooperation with an innovative treatment centre in California called Project Walk.

In 2015, Pollock sued Enda and Madeline Cahill, his friends and owners of the property he was staying at when he had his fall, claiming the Cahills had disregarded a "reasonably foreseeable risk" of him being seriously injured and that they should have made sure the window remained closed or at least warned him it was open. The court found the couple liable saying he was "satisfied that the Cahills failed to discharge the common law duty of care they owed as occupiers. The open window was a real risk to Mr Pollock. They created that risk". Pollock's lawyers confirmed he had limited his claim to a maximum of £2 million, the limit of the Cahills' household insurance, so the couple did not have to pay out themselves.

== Honors and awards ==
In addition to the honorary degree awarded by Trinity College, Dublin mentioned above, Pollock has been awarded an Honorary Doctorate from Queen's University Belfast, and has been named a Young Global Leader. Mark also was awarded an Honorary Doctorate in 2015 by Royal College of Surgeons in Ireland.

In 2012, Pollock was honored with a Rehab People of the Year Award.

In 2020, Pollock was awarded UCD Alumnus of the Year in Business.
