= Rusheen Bay =

Bay near Galway city, Ireland

Coordinates: 53.257°N 9.118°W

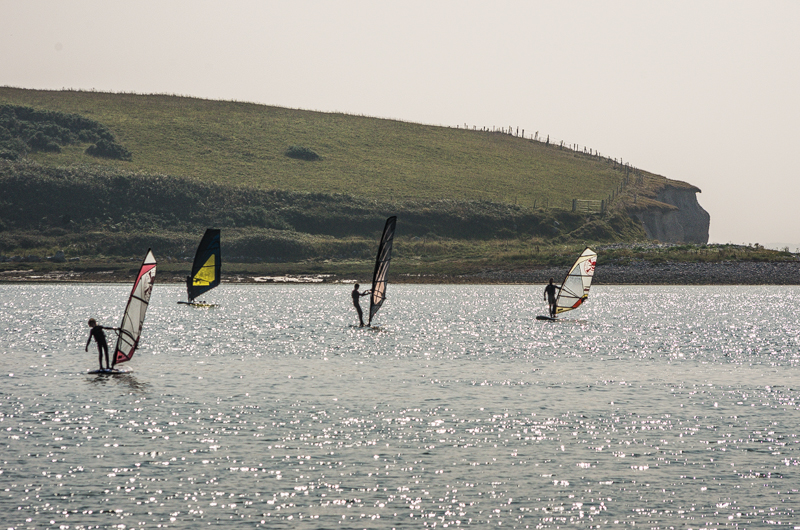
Windsurfers in Rusheen Bay

Rusheen Bay (Irish: Cuan an Roisín) is a bay in County Galway on the west coast of Ireland. Rusheen Bay is near Galway city and is known for windsurfing. This bay is used for both flat water ballasting and freestyle. The Rusheen Bay Windsurfing School is open from April through to September and provides lessons and rentals for windsurfing, kayaking and stand-up paddleboarding.

Eight children were rescued from drowning in the bay by surfers in July 2015, in an incident that saw a number of bravery awards and one of the rescuers, Alan Herdman, was named Young Person of The Year for his actions.
