= Roddy McCuish =

Scottish politician

Leader of Argyll and Bute Council
- In office 23 May 2013 – 26 September 2013
- Preceded by: James Robb
- Succeeded by: Dick Walsh
- In office 22 May 2012 – 14 February 2013
- Preceded by: Dick Walsh
- Succeeded by: James Robb

Member of Argyll and Bute Council
- In office 3 May 2007 – 5 May 2022
- Preceded by: Ward created
- Succeeded by: Willie Hume
- Constituency: Oban South and the Isles

Personal details
- Born: October 1954 (age 71–72) Scotland
- Party: ISP (since 2021); Independent (2013 - 2021)
- Other political affiliations: Scottish National Party (before 2013)

Roderick William "Roddy" McCuish is a Scottish former politician who was an Argyll and Bute Councillor for the Oban South and the Isles ward from 2007 to 2022, having formerly been the leader twice, both with the Scottish National Party (SNP) and later as an independent. On 8 January 2021, it was announced that he had joined the Independence for Scotland Party (ISP), becoming their first representative holding political office until the 2022 Council election, when he did not seek re-election.

== Political career ==
McCuish first stood for election for the Oban South and the Isles ward in the 2007 Scottish Local Elections, polling 955 first preferences and topping the polling in the ward and taking the first seat out of four.

In advance of the 2012 Scottish Local Elections he was elected to replace his party colleague, Cllr Robert MacIntyre, as SNP Group Leader and Director of Elections. At the 2012 Local Government election, McCuish polled 767 first preferences and was re-elected for the ward of Oban South and the Isle, taking the second seat in a ward where the SNP gained three out of the four seats, which at the time, was the party's strongest ward in all of Scotland. At the 2012 election, the SNP gained three seats in Argyll and Bute Council to have a total of thirteen, which with the help of the Argyll First group of Independents and some other Independent members gave them a controlling majority on the council, which McCuish was appointed as Council Leader.

In June 2012 McCuish intervened after the council had attempted to ban nine year old Martha Payne from blogging about her school dinners. The story had been reported globally, including his explanations of the actions taken by the council. McCuish considered that this episode had been a political disaster for Argyll and Bute Council, especially because it occurred so soon after the formation of the new administration.

The coalition council of Independents, Argyll First, and the SNP did not last long, and McCuish fell out with the SNP because the SNP national executive would not let the SNP group in Argyll and Bute Council form a coalition with the Scottish Conservatives and Liberal Democrats. McCuish resigned as council leader in February 2013 and, along with another councillor, he left the SNP party to sit as an independent. McCuish was re-elected as council leader in May 2013, although he had no deputy leader and no clear administration. His second stint was brief, only lasting until September 2013.

McCuish was re-elected to the same seat in the 2017 election.

On 8 January 2021 it was announced that he had joined the Independence for Scotland Party (ISP), after discussions with that party's founder Colette Walker. In doing so, he became the first elected representative for the party, although he was elected as an independent. He did not seek re-election in May 2022.

Hailing from Oban, a shinty heartland, he has been involved in the game for many years. Whilst never playing the sport, his connections to local government have made him a key figure in the game in the south region. Elected to the Camanachd Association board in 2020, he served the maximum six years on the board, a role he coupled with his presidency of the Macaulay Association, which is in charge of the Macaulay Cup and several youth competitions in the local area.
