= Eileen Proctor =

Irish seamstress, psychiatric nurse and telephonist

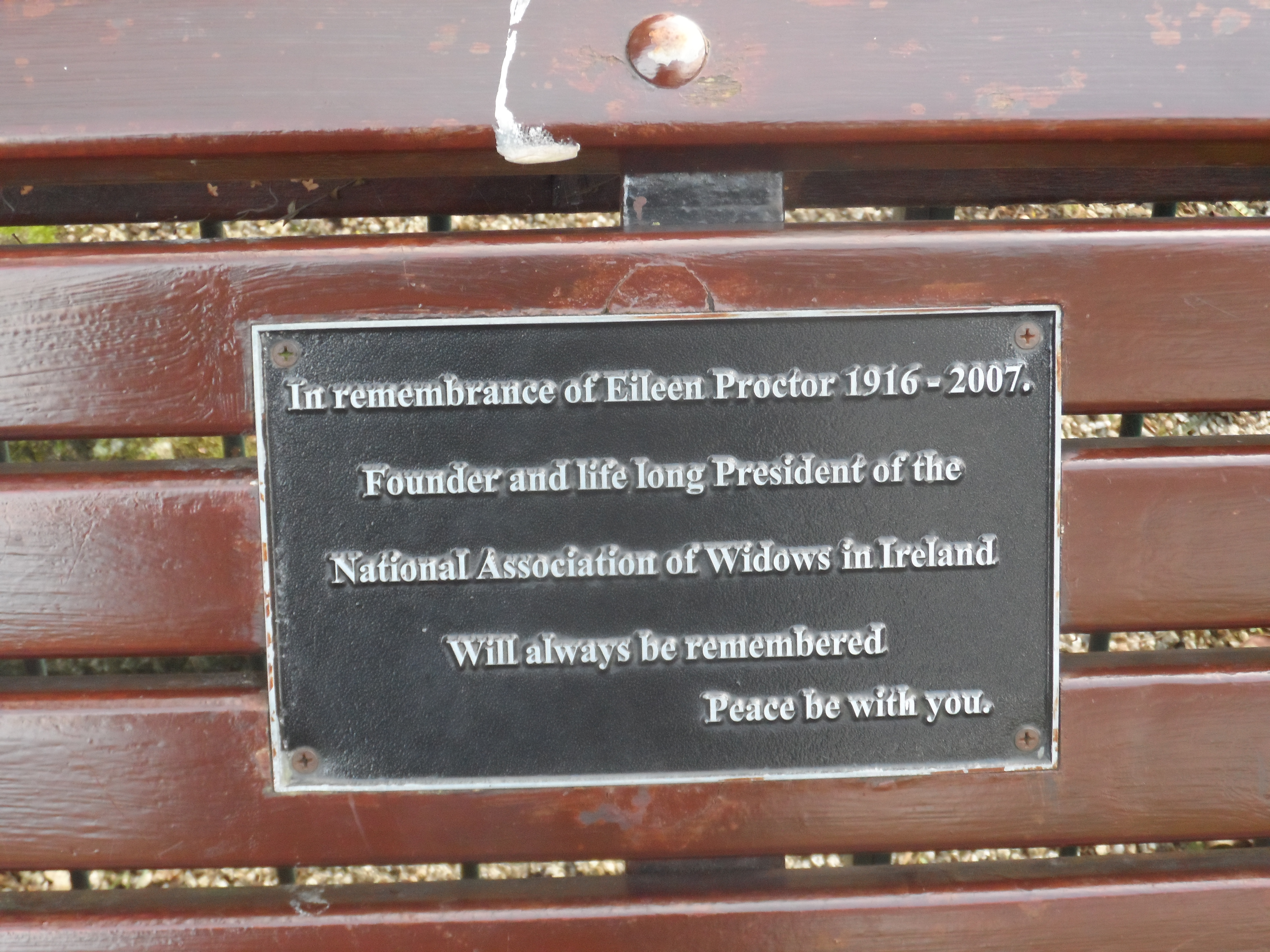
- Memorial plaque to Proctor, St Stephen's Green
- Born: Eileen Field; 11 August 1916; London, United Kingdom
- Died: 3 December 2007 (aged 91); Dublin, Ireland
- Burial place: Mount Venus Cemetery, Rathfarnham
- Occupations: seamstress, psychiatric nurse, telephonist
- Spouse: Proctor
- Children: 4

Eileen Proctor (née Field; 11 August 1916 – 3 December 2007) was an Irish woman, the founder and president of the National Association of Widows in Ireland (NAWI).

== Early life ==
Eileen Field was born in London in 1916. She worked as a seamstress and psychiatric nurse, and as a telephonist during the London Blitz.

== National Association of Widows in Ireland ==
Proctor was widowed in December 1962 when her husband was knocked down by a bus while cycling home from work. In 1966 she wrote a letter to The Irish Press seeking support from other widows. The National Association of Widows in Ireland was founded in Dublin in January 1967. Proctor served as its president until her death in 2007.

Lobbying by the NAWI introduced more benefits for widows, including an electricity allowance; free TV licence, free phone rental, a "Living Alone" allowance, double pension at Christmas, a supplementary benefit for pensioners and those on small, fixed incomes; and widows of Easter Rising veterans. Proctor won a People of the Year Award in 1977.
