= Mary Dunlop =

Irish activist (1912–2003)

- Born: Mary Edith Hobart; 25 November 1912; Cork, Ireland
- Died: 20 December 2003 (aged 91); Blackrock, Cork, Ireland
- Occupation: Campaigner for the welfare of the blind

Mary Dunlop (25 November 1912 – 20 December 2003) was an Irish campaigner for the welfare of the blind and co‐founder of the Irish Guide Dogs for the Blind.

== Early life and family ==
Mary Dunlop was born Mary Edith Hobart on 25 November 1912 at 33 South Mall, Cork, Ireland. She was the only daughter of three surviving children of general medical practitioner Nathaniel Henry "Ted" Hobart (born 1867) and Edith Guest Hobart (née Lane) (1881–1912). Her mother died of pneumonia three days after Dunlop's birth. The family later lived on Blackrock Road, Cork, and then in Currabinny, County Cork. The family were Church of Ireland. Dunlop attended school in England, returning to Ireland to look after her father's home.

She married Robert Andrew Egerton Dunlop (1902–1967) on 25 November 1933 on her 21 birthday. Her husband was from County Dublin and was a lieutenant in the Royal Army Service Corps in Edinburgh, having served previously at Camden Fort Meagher. They lived in Scotland until World War II broke out. They had one surviving daughter, Jill, born in 1935. They also had twins who died a few weeks after their birth. Her husband served in the British expeditionary force which was evacuated from Dunkirk in 1940. Dunlop travelled with him to his wartime postings in Egypt, Palestine, Libya, and Ghana. She served as an ambulance driver in north Africa. After her husband's retirement from the army at the rank of lieutenant‐colonel, he worked as the transport manager with a Cork brewery with the family living in Currabinny. Dunlop was widowed when he died in a commercial passenger airplane crash on 3 June 1967 over the Pyrenees.

== Charity work ==
Dunlop had an interest in the welfare of blind people, having learnt the restrictions experienced by a blind uncle-in-law. With her husband, she became active with The Guide Dogs for the Blind Association (GDBA), and went on to raise funds in Ireland for the association. Dunlop was voluntary organiser in Ireland for the GDBA by the early 1970s, serving on the executive of the Cork county branch of the National Council for the Blind of Ireland. She adopted a German shepherd dog, Jan, who had been bred by the association. She trained Jan and appeared at agricultural shows, horse shows, and dog shows across Ireland. Jan was popular with audiences, and her shows were effective fund-raising events, demonstrating how highly trained dogs could be. They became well known in Ireland, with Jan and Dunlop on The Late Late Show in 1969.

A four-dog demonstration toured Ireland for the GDBA, with the funds raised used largely to send people from Ireland to the Exeter GDBA centre to be trained in using guide dogs as the training was not available in Ireland. Only 24 Irish guide dog and owner partnerships had been facilitated by the mid-1970s. Dunlop firmly believed that many more Irish people would benefit from guide dog services, she partnered with Jim Dennehy, Cork businessman who was accidentally blinded as an adult. In June 1976 they co-founded the Irish Guide Dogs Association (IGDA), later the Irish Guide Dogs for the Blind (IGDB). The inaugural meeting at which Dunlop was elected president, took place in the Mansion House, Dublin and was chaired by broadcaster Jim Sherwin.

With aspirations for a mobility centre in Ireland to provide training in using guide dogs and other mobility aids, they secured premises in Drumcondra, Dublin. Other Irish organisations for the blind didn't advocate for devoting their scarce resources towards training and providing guide dogs as there was a scepticism about how many people would benefit from them and that handling dogs would pose issues for their clients. Dunlop and others in the IGDA were confronting the perception in Irish society that those who were blind were helpless and unable to live independent lives. The IGDA advocated for giving training and support to blind people they could develop their talent and potential. The new association faced problems internally with the Drumcondra site proving unsuitable, issues sourcing dogs suitable to be trained, and disagreements about policy and spending. In June 1979, an interim 3-year agreement was found with the British GDBA which proved a turning point. The agreement meant the British GDBA supplied dogs and training for the Irish staff in preparation for a completely independent Irish association. By 1980, the IGDA had moved to a converted farmhouse on Model Farm Road, Cork, where they trained their first two dogs. At the new Cork centre, an Irish breeding programme was founded to supply dogs, where dogs were matched with owners and training was provided for their use, with post-training support. Mobility training and rehabilitation was also offered to those who were blind and visually impaired. In 1981, Dunlop was given the People of the Year Award, which she accepted on behalf of the association. She oversaw the training of the dogs and was known in the centre as "Mrs D".

Dunlop lived at Liscurra, Carrigaline, County Cork, from the early 1970s. She died at Castlemahon nursing home, Blackrock, Cork, on 20 December 2003.
