= Cuan Mhuire =

- Company type: Rehabilitation organisation
- Founded: 1966
- Headquarters: Ireland
- Key people: Sr. Consilio – founder
- Revenue: 6,874,915 euro (2014)
- Total assets: 35,021,023 euro (2023)
- Number of employees: 214 (2023)
- Website: cuanmhuire.ie

Cuan Mhuire (pronounced [ˌkuən̪ˠ ˈwɪɾʲə]; Irish for "Mary's Harbour") is a charitable drug, alcohol and gambling rehabilitation organisation in Ireland. Cuan Mhuire provides a residential programme to persons suffering from alcohol, other chemical dependencies and gambling. It was founded by Sr. Consilio Fitzgerald a member of the Sisters of Mercy in 1966 and has rehabilitation centres and other facilities, dealing with approximately 2,500 people each year.

== History and development ==
Cuan Mhuire was founded by Consilio in 1966. Consilio had qualified as a nurse and a midwife and had been stationed in St. Vincent's Hospital in Athy, County Kildare.

=== Dairy ===
In 1965 Consilio convinced the nuns in Athy to convert the dairy of the convent into a 'drop in' centre, where she could greet her visitors and listen to their troubles. This dairy became the focal point of Consilio's work with the homeless and the addicts. By this time, a few tradesmen had begun to recover from their addiction and they set to work on the dairy. Thus, a functioning unit began. As the building was being reconstructed, so too were peoples lives being reconstructed.

In the early days, the dairy became known as the 'dug out', so Consilio felt she must give it a proper name. Her friend, Dr. Des O'Neill who had helped in the development of Cuan Mhuire, suggested the name "An Cuan" meaning "The Harbour". Consilio felt that it would have to include Our Lady's name and said none of this would have been possible without her– hence the name "Cuan Mhuire".

=== First purpose-built rehabilitation centre ===
In November 1972, a farm of land came up for sale just outside Athy. Consilio, encouraged by the support of her Mother superior, paid a visit to the local bank manager. He asked how she would pay for it. She told him that "Our Lady would provide". Consilio attended the auction in full nun regalia, and she came away from the auction with a forty-two acre field and no way to pay for it. The bank manager later discovered that Consilio had paid off the purchase price in full, and he had not to worry about honouring the big cheque. When he asked her how she managed to pay for the land, she replied: "Our Lady helped me".

== Locations ==
Residential treatment centres
Teach Mhuire locations
Training locations

As of 2019, Cuan Mhuire had five full residential centres, three residential transition houses and two training centres in Ireland.

Full residential centres

- Cuan Mhuire, Cardenton, Athy, County Kildare.
- Cuan Mhuire, Coolarne, Athenry, County Galway.
- Cuan Mhuire, Bruree, County Limerick.
- Cuan Mhuire, Newry, County Down, Northern Ireland.
- Cuan Mhuire, Farnanes, County Cork. (women only)

Residential transition houses

- Teach Mhuire, 38–39 Lower Gardiner Street, Dublin. (men)
- Sancta Maria, Hamilton Street, Dublin. (women)
- Teach Mhuire, 21 St. Helen's Street, Galway. (men)
- Teach Mhuire, Roxboro Road, Limerick. (men)
- Sancta Maria, North Circular Road, Limerick. (women)
- Cuan Mhuire, Corfad, Ballybay, County Monaghan. (men)
- Teach Mhuire, Western Road, Cork. (men)

Training

- Cuan Mhuire, Ballycarron, Golden, County Tipperary, provides in-service training for Cuan Mhuire and other staff.
- An accredited two-year Diploma in Counselling is offered from the Galilee House of Studies in Athy.
