= Merašice =

- Municipality
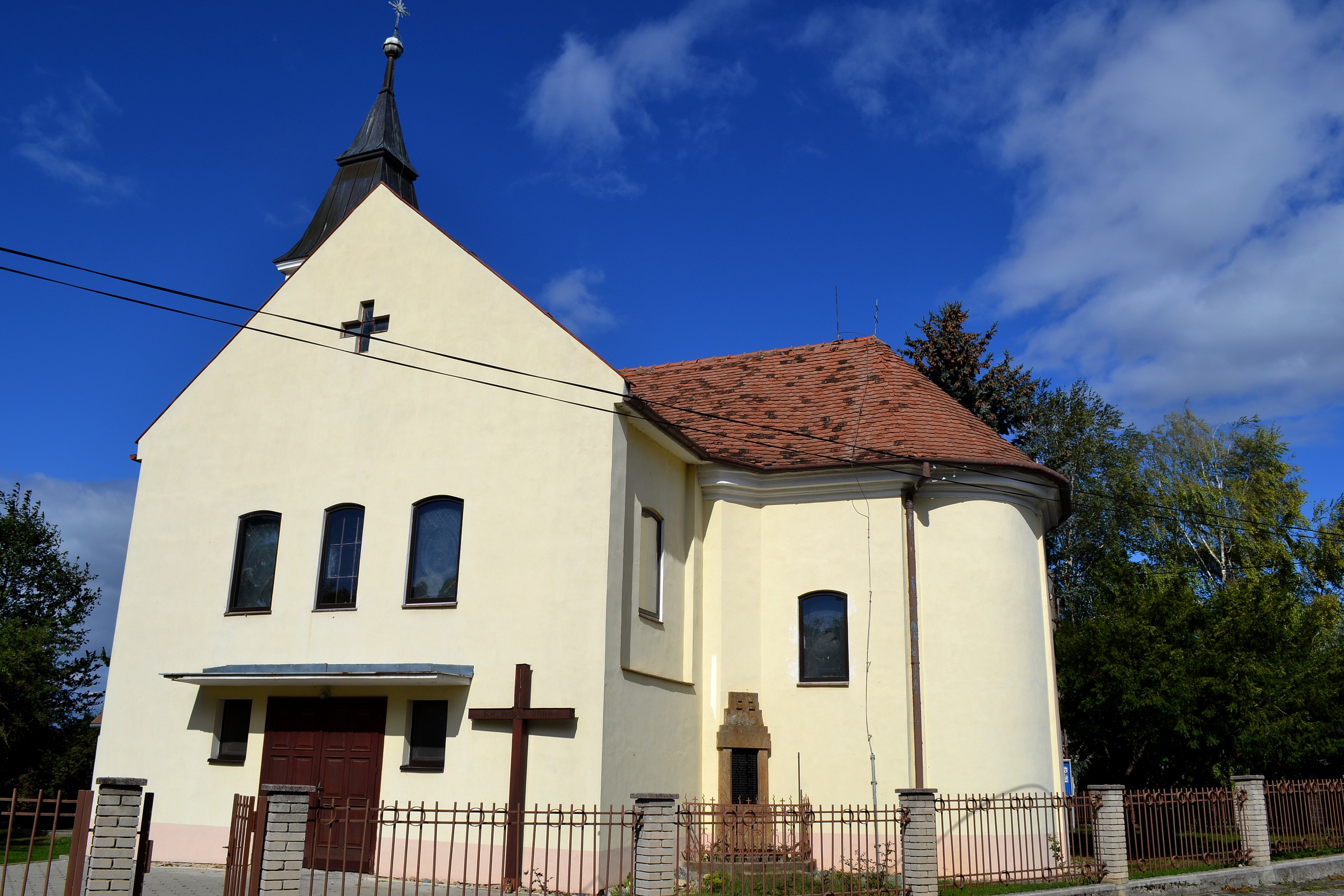

- Flag

- Location of Merašice in the Trnava Region Location of Merašice in Slovakia
- Coordinates: 48.47°N 17.95°E
- Country: Slovakia
- Region: Trnava Region
- District: Hlohovec District
- First mentioned: 1390

Area
  - Total: 4.93 km^{2} (1.90 sq mi)
- Elevation: 172 m (564 ft)

Population (2025)
  - Total: 447
- Time zone: UTC+1 (CET)
  - Summer (DST): UTC+2 (CEST)
- Postal code: 920 61
- Area code: +421 33
- Vehicle registration plate (until 2022): HC
- Website: www.merasice.sk

Merašice (Hungarian: Merőce) is a village and municipality in Hlohovec District in the Trnava Region of western Slovakia.

== History ==
In historical records the village was first mentioned in 1390.

== Geography ==
The municipality lies at an altitude of 172 metres (564 ft) and covers an area of 4.93 km^{2} (1.90 sq mi) (2025).

== Population ==
Population statistic (10 years)
| Year | 1995 | 2005 | 2015 | 2025 |
|---|---|---|---|---|
| Count | 371 | 413 | 450 | 447 |
| Difference | | +11.32% | +8.95% | −0.66% |

Population statistic
| Year | 2024 | 2025 |
|---|---|---|
| Count | 447 | 447 |
| Difference | | +0% |

It has a population of 447 people (31 December 2025).

=== Ethnicity ===
Census 2021 (1+ %)
| Ethnicity | Number | Fraction |
|---|---|---|
| Slovak | 410 | 96.24% |
| Not found out | 12 | 2.81% |
| Hungarian | 5 | 1.17% |
| Total | 426 | |

In year 2021 was 426 people by ethnicity 410 as Slovak, 12 as Not found out, 5 as Hungarian, 3 as Czech, 2 as Romani, 1 as Polish, 1 as Other and 1 as English.

Note on population: The difference values of population numbers in the table "Population statistic" and in the sections "Ethnicity" & "Religion" is caused by the use of various statistical methods.

=== Religion ===
Census 2021 (1+ %)
| Religion | Number | Fraction |
|---|---|---|
| Roman Catholic Church | 329 | 77.23% |
| None | 66 | 15.49% |
| Not found out | 11 | 2.58% |
| Evangelical Church | 7 | 1.64% |
| Paganism and natural spirituality | 5 | 1.17% |
| Total | 426 | |

In year 2021 was 426 people by religion 329 from Roman Catholic Church, 66 from None, 11 from Not found out, 7 from Evangelical Church, 5 from Paganism and natural spirituality, 4 from Christian Congregations in Slovakia, 2 from Ad hoc movements, 1 from Buddhism and 1 from Apostolic Church.
