= Mary's Meals =

Children's charity

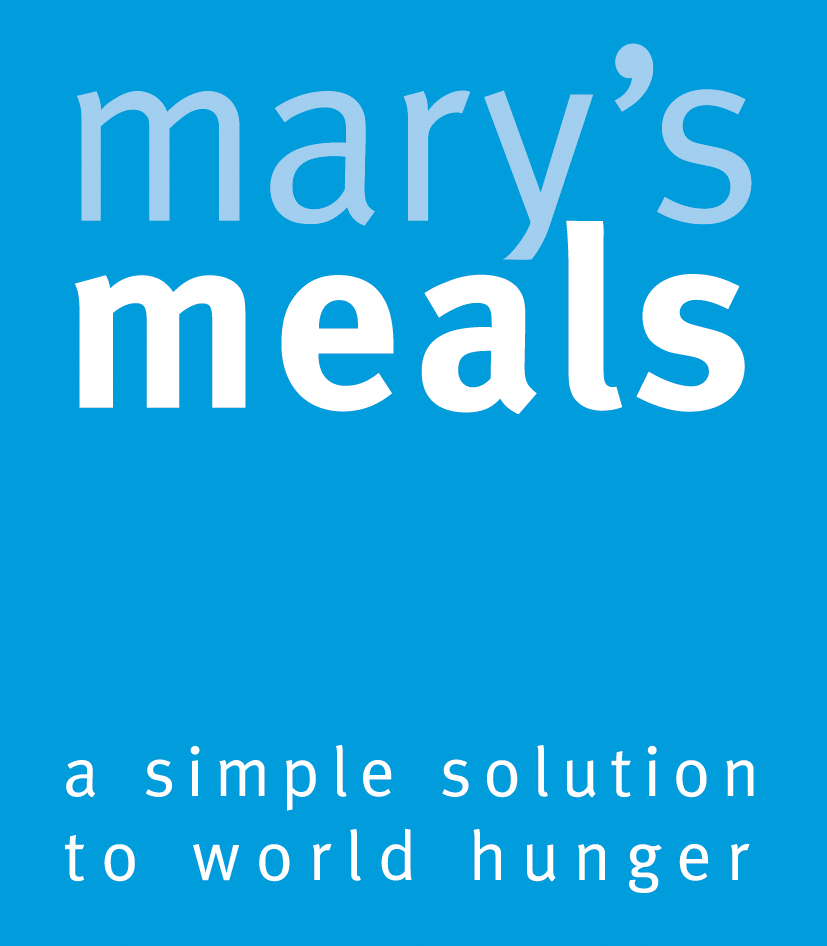
- Founded: 1992 (SIR) 2002 (Mary's Meals)
- Founder: Magnus MacFarlane-Barrow; Fergus MacFarlane-Barrow
- Purpose: School feeding
- Location: Dalmally, Scotland
- Region served: Developing world
- Website: marysmeals.org

Mary's Meals, formerly known as Scottish International Relief (SIR), is a registered charity which sets up school feeding programmes in some of the world's poorest communities, where hunger and poverty prevent children from gaining an education. It was founded in 2002 and has grown from its first feeding operation of 200 children in Malawi, to a worldwide campaign, providing free school meals in hundreds of schools and feeding more than three million children daily. Mary's Meals is named after Mary, the mother of Jesus, by its founders, who were inspired by their Catholic faith, although the charity is not a Catholic organisation.

== History ==
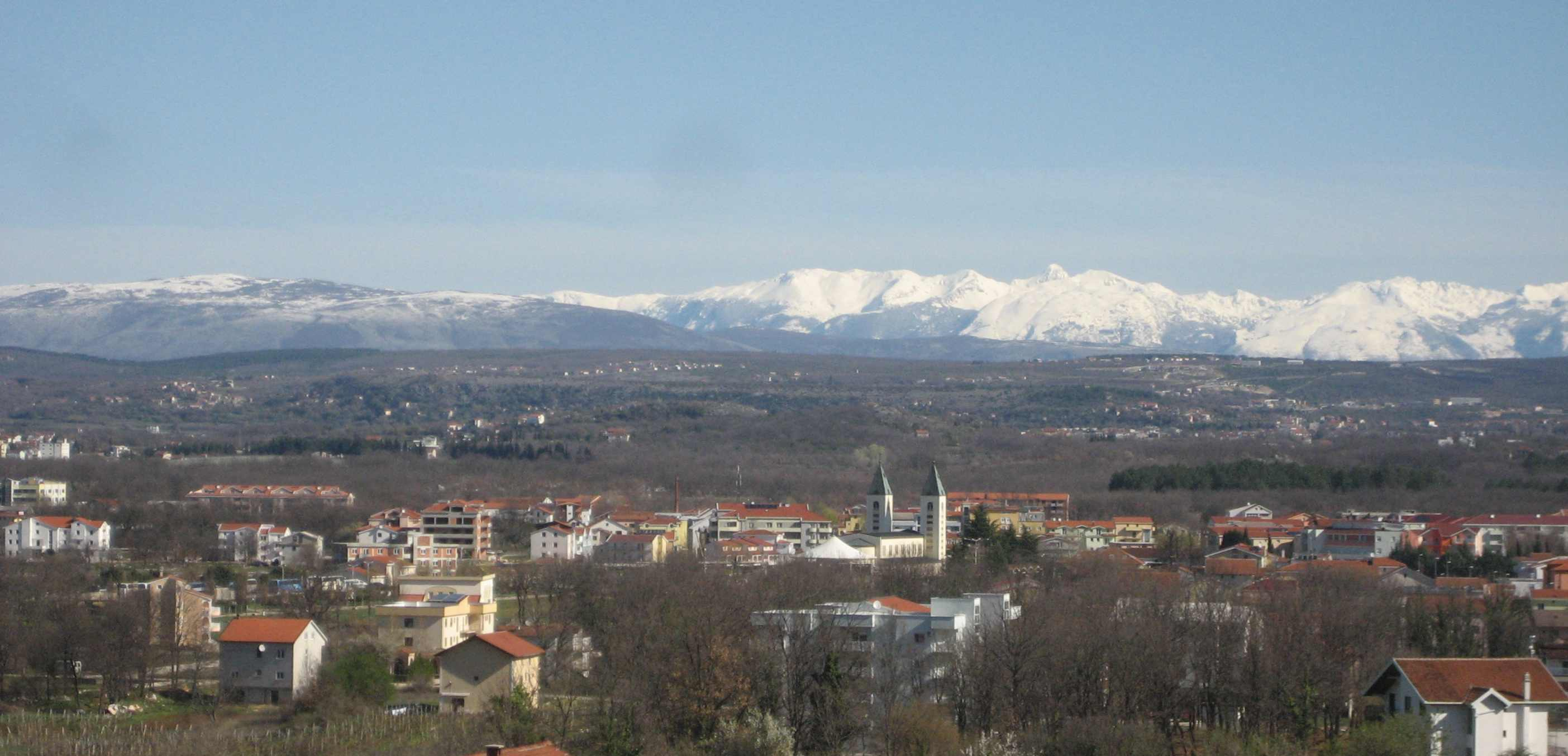
Medjugorje in Bosnia and Herzegovina.

SIR began in 1992 during the Bosnian War, when brothers Magnus MacFarlane-Barrow, OBE, FRSGS, and Fergus MacFarlane-Barrow organised a local appeal for blankets and food. They filled a Jeep with aid and delivered their cargo to Medjugorje in Bosnia and Herzegovina. They returned to Scotland expecting to resume work as fish farmers in Argyll, but in their absence, their parents' shed had been filled with yet more donations, resulting in eventually driving from Scotland to Bosnia a total of 23 times to deliver supplies.

Magnus took a 'gap year' and has never gone back to his old job. The project was registered as a charity, then named as Scottish International Relief.

During a trip to Malawi in 2002, Magnus decided to attract girls and boys to school by providing meals. From feeding 200 children in southern Malawi in 2002, Mary's Meals now works with communities in 17 different countries around the world, providing meals for more than 3 million children every school day.

In 2023, Mary's Meals was awarded the Premio Princesa de Asturias de la Concordia.

== Magnus MacFarlane-Barrow ==
In 2010, Magnus was praised as a CNN Hero for his role in founding and running Mary's Meals.

He was appointed Officer of the Order of the British Empire (OBE) in the 2011 New Year Honours. In April 2015, he was named one of Time magazine's 100 most influential people in the world. Magnus' book, The Shed That Fed A Million Children, reached the UK's prestigious Times and Sunday Times best-seller list immediately after its release. Magnus has also received honorary degrees from the University of Hull, Glasgow Caledonian University, the University of Stirling, and the University of Strathclyde.

Magnus has given many public talks to audiences large and small, including delivering the key note address at the World Food Prize in 2013. He has also spoken at youth festivals and Christian conferences and other speaker events geared at a variety of audiences including entrepreneurs, food industry experts and educators.

Magnus was awarded the Human Dignity Award in 2014, by the speaker of the Dail (Irish Parliament) on behalf of the Oireachtas (Irish Parliament) Human Dignity Group, in recognition for his contribution to human rights and dignity.

Soon after, Magnus met Julie, a nurse, who volunteered to help him deliver emergency aid. Julie became committed to the charity, and its founder too. The couple married and now have seven children together.

== Mary's Meals ==
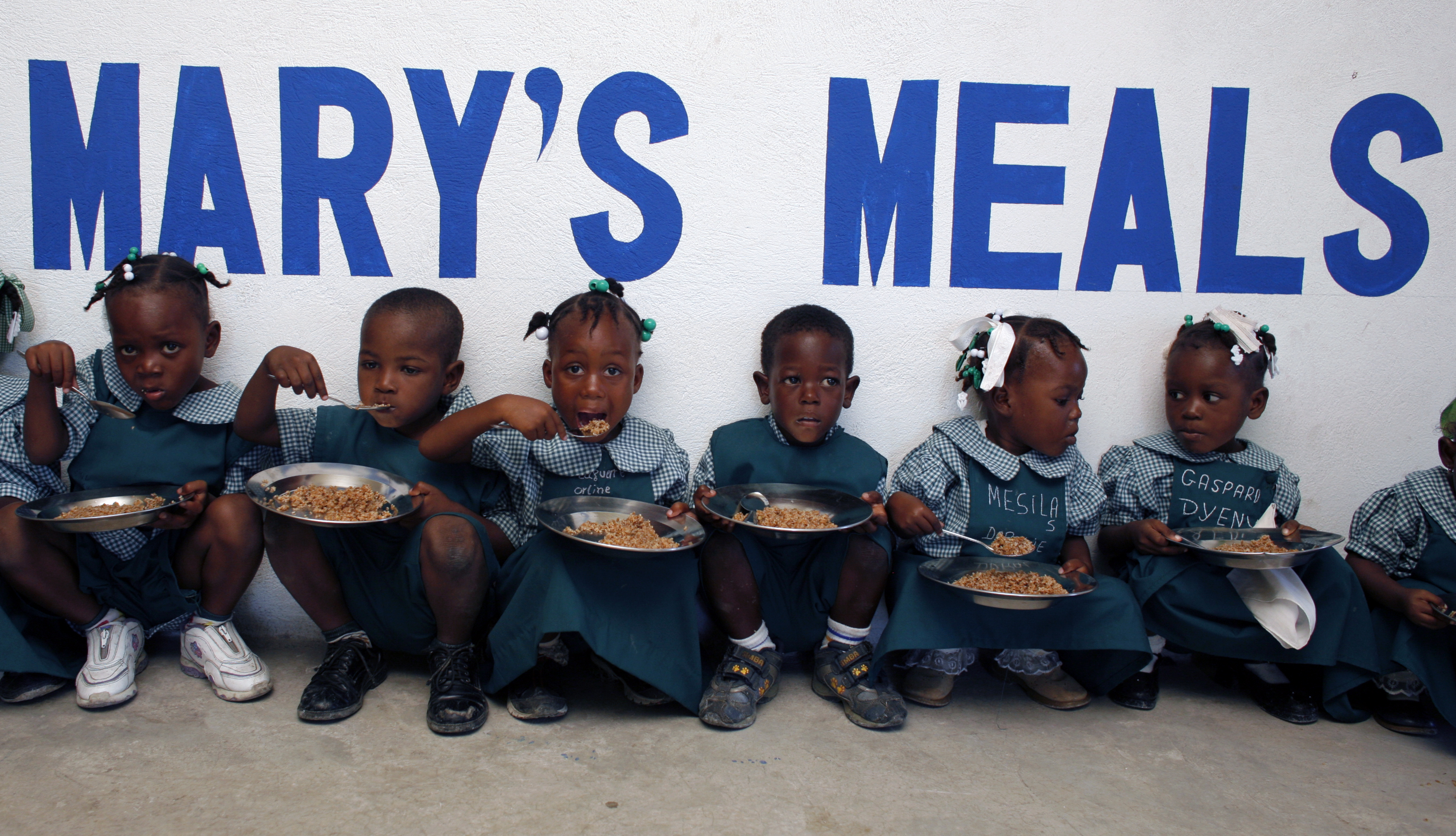
Mary's Meals Haiti by Angela Catlin

Mary's Meals is a global movement which sets up school feeding programmes in communities where poverty and hunger prevent children from gaining an education. Mary's Meals provides daily meals in school for more than one million children in Africa, Asia, Latin America, the Caribbean and Eastern Europe.

Support for Mary's Meals is global, with fundraising groups in Australia, Austria, Canada, Croatia, France, Germany, Ireland, Italy, the Netherlands, Portugal, Spain, Switzerland, UAE, UK and USA.

=== Malawi ===
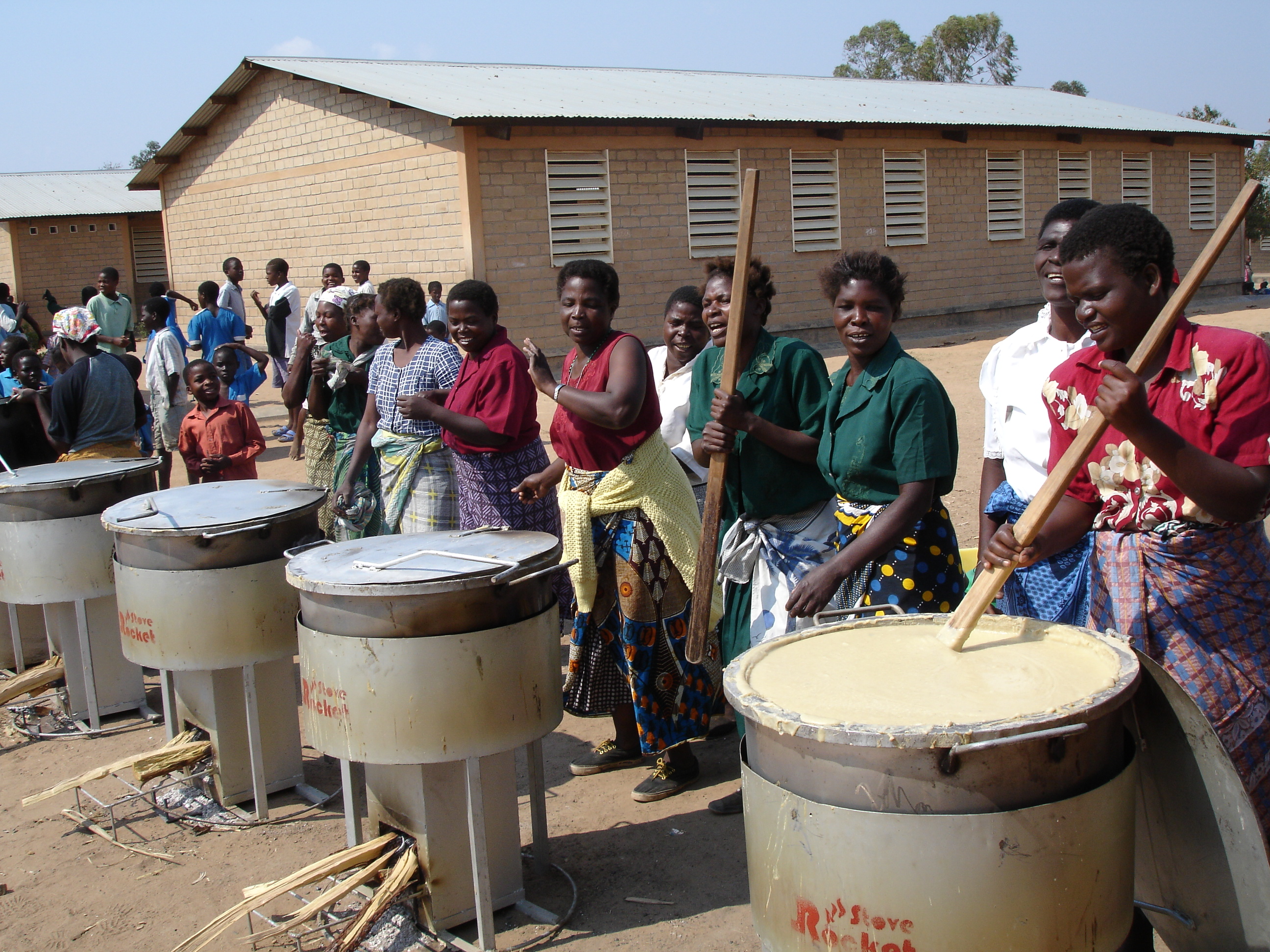
Volunteers preparing the Likuni Phala

In Malawi, usually land is donated in order to build a kitchen adjacent to the school. Teachers and parents organise a pool of volunteers who will take their turn cooking and serving the meals.

Mary's Meals provides the kitchen, cooking equipment, training, ongoing support and of course, regular supplies of nutritious Likuni Phala. Each project is visited regularly by Mary's Meals' staff to support the volunteers and ensure the smooth running of the programme. They also collect data from the school to monitor the impact school feeding is having on the students.

=== The Backpack Project ===
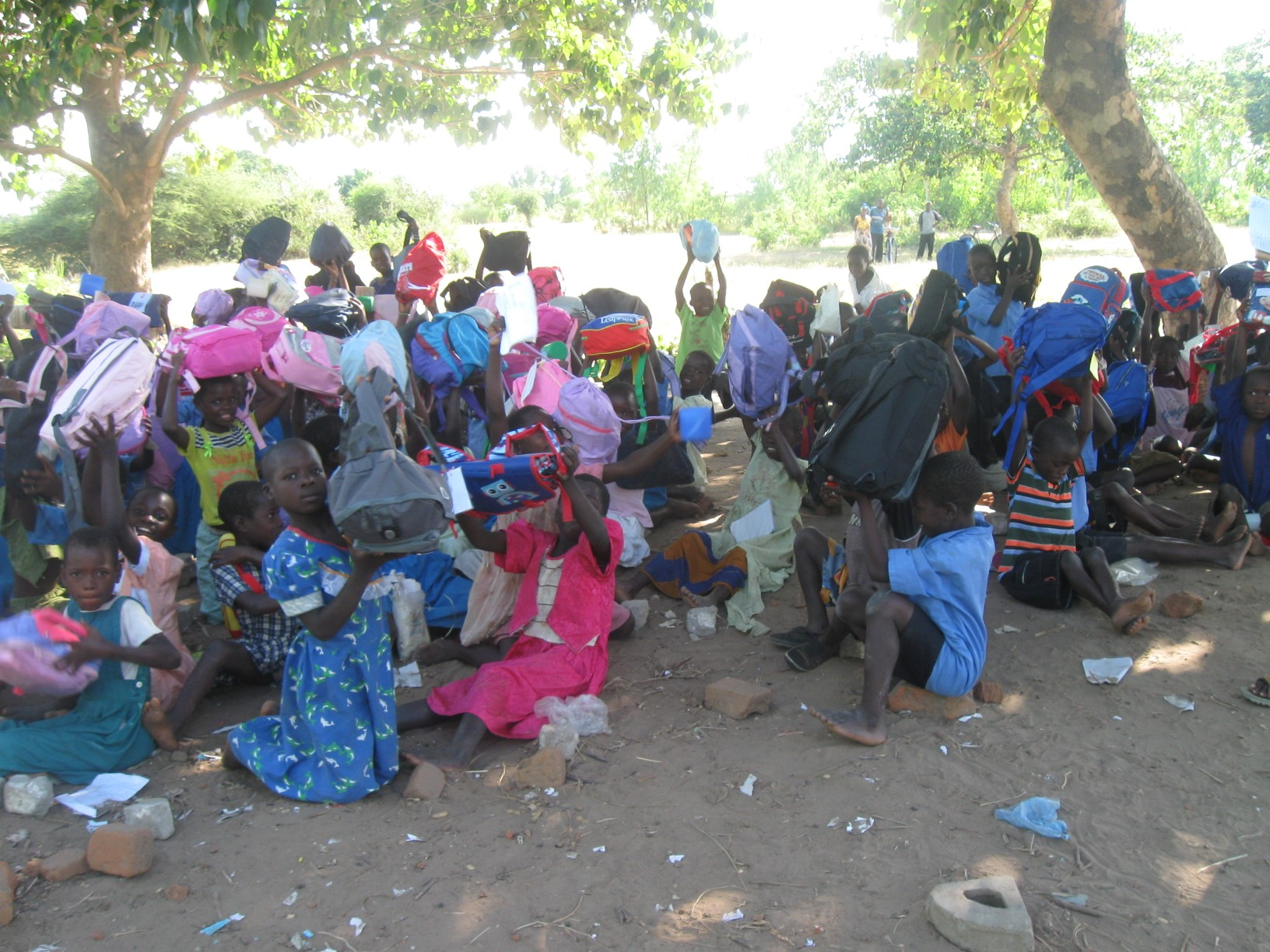
Backpacks at Chisebe Primary School, Malawi

One of Mary's Meals' projects is The Backpack Project, which encourages supporters to donate school backpacks and fill them with materials such as notebooks, pencils, flip-flops and T-shirts to send to children in Malawi. The Backpack Project was the subject of TV coverage through Five's Britain's Kindest Kids competition, and an STV feature on Holyrood Secondary School pupils' visit to Malawi.

=== Emergency Aid ===
Today, the main focus of Mary's Meals is its school feeding programmes, but it also has a history of providing emergency relief to many countries, such as Haiti, Somalia, Bosnia and Kosovo.

==== Somalia ====
During the 2011 East Africa drought, Mary's Meals launched a public appeal for funds to help people suffering as a result of the famine in Somalia which, at its height, was estimated by the UN to be claiming the lives of 250 children every day. Joining forces with South African charity Gift of the Givers, Mary's Meals has sent likuni phala – the same nutritional maize-based porridge that it feeds to children at Mary's Meals school feeding programmes in Malawi – to the Somali capital Mogadishu. As of April 2012, food from Mary's Meals – cooked and served in feeding camps by Gift of the Givers – has amounted to 6.8 million meals.

==== Haiti ====
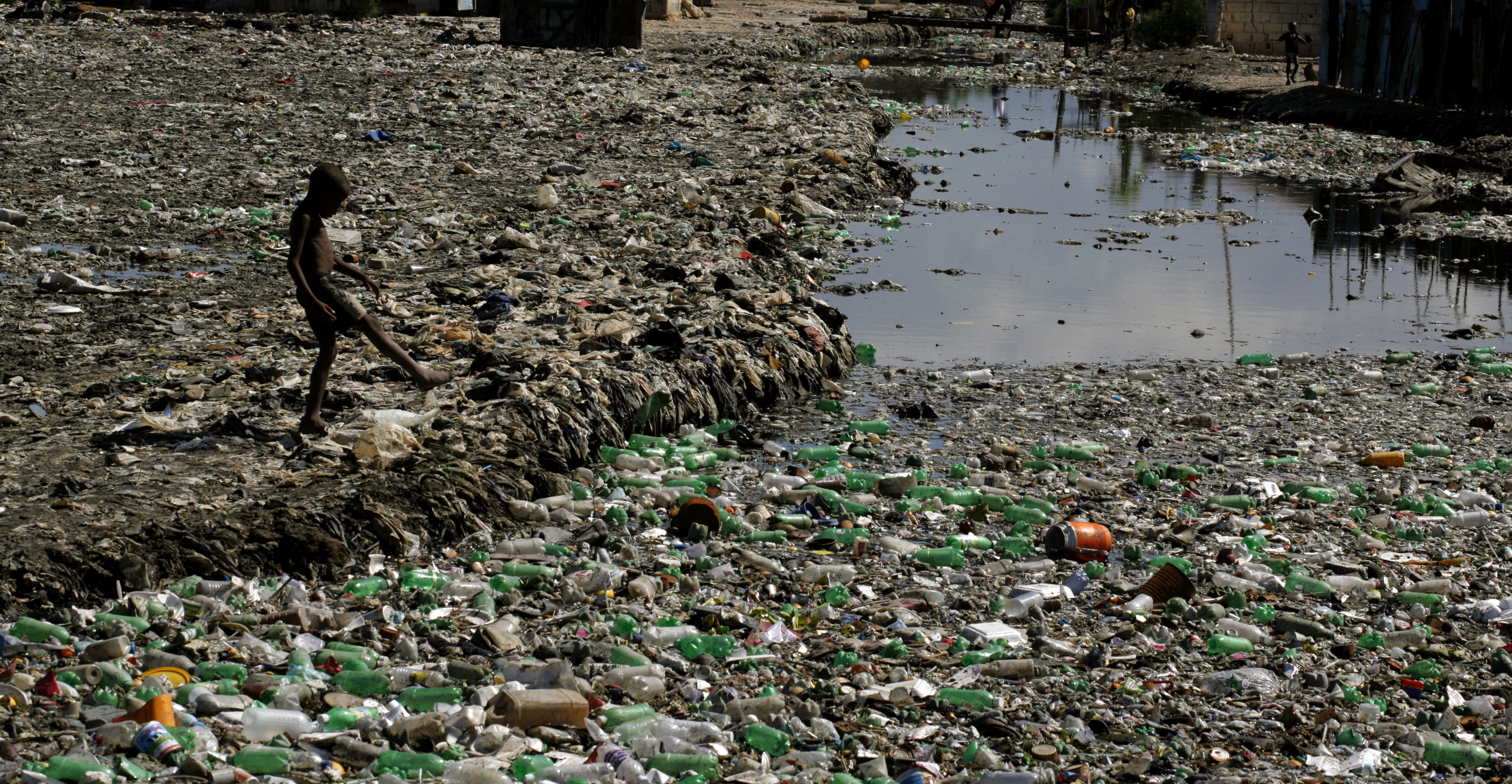
Cité Soleil, Haiti. Prior to the earthquake this slum built on a rubbish dump was home to 500,000

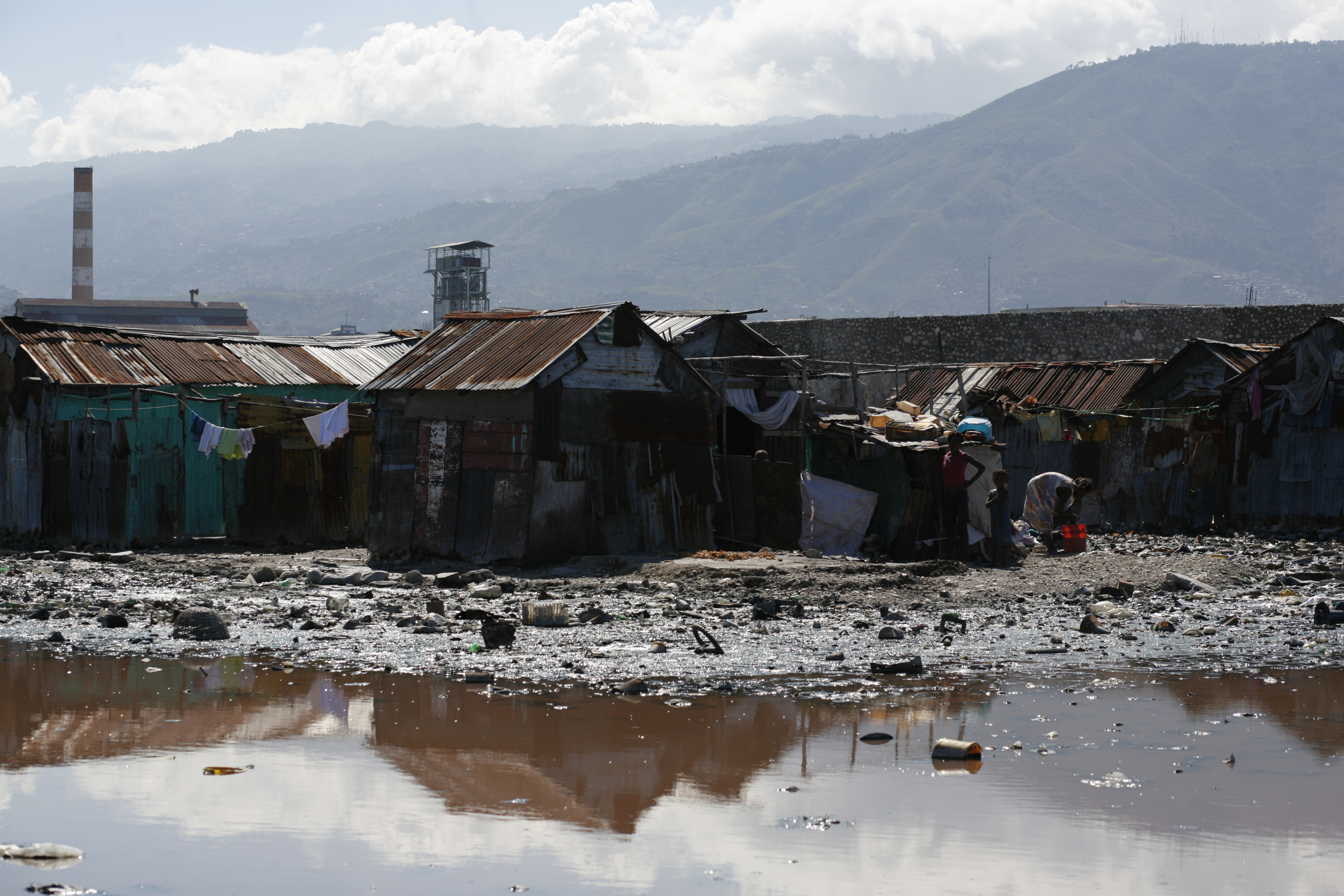
Cité Soleil. Mary's Meals fed 6000 primary school children here before the earthquake, the rebuilding process is well under way.

On 12 January 2010 a magnitude 7 earthquake struck Haiti at around 5 pm local time. The quake killed an estimated 200,000 people, left thousands more homeless and devastated the capital Port-au-Prince. Haiti was already the poorest nation in the Americas before this disaster which was why Mary's Meals was working there. Members of the team of Mary's Meals partners in Port-au-Prince were killed and their office buildings destroyed. In nearby Cité Soleil the 8 schools served by Mary's Meals were badly damaged. Magnus MacFarlane-Barrow visited Haiti a few days later and once more in July 2010. He reported progress in the massive rebuilding projects underway but expressed that with the amount of money being donated not enough was being done by the charities working in Haiti.

==== Burma ====
Cyclone Nargis left thousands dead and thousands more homeless with their livelihoods ruined. Mary's Meals already had partners in Burma and their long experience of working in the particularly difficult conditions within Burma meant they were able to gain access to areas badly affected by the floods. As a result, Mary's Meals were able to run several relief and rehabilitation projects. Among them are: the provision of food, clean water and clothing, the rebuilding of 3 schools destroyed by the storms and an orphanage that will provide care for abandoned children.

==== Bangladesh ====
In November 2007 a cyclone caused waves 10 to 15 feet in height that swept away the fragile houses of the poor in Borguna, Bangladesh. Relief materials were distributed. The community appealed to Mary's Meals for assistance and soon they were providing help to rebuild a collapsed secondary school in Borguna. The reconstructed building was designed to double up as cyclone shelter to protect people from the community from storms in the future.

==== Iona House ====
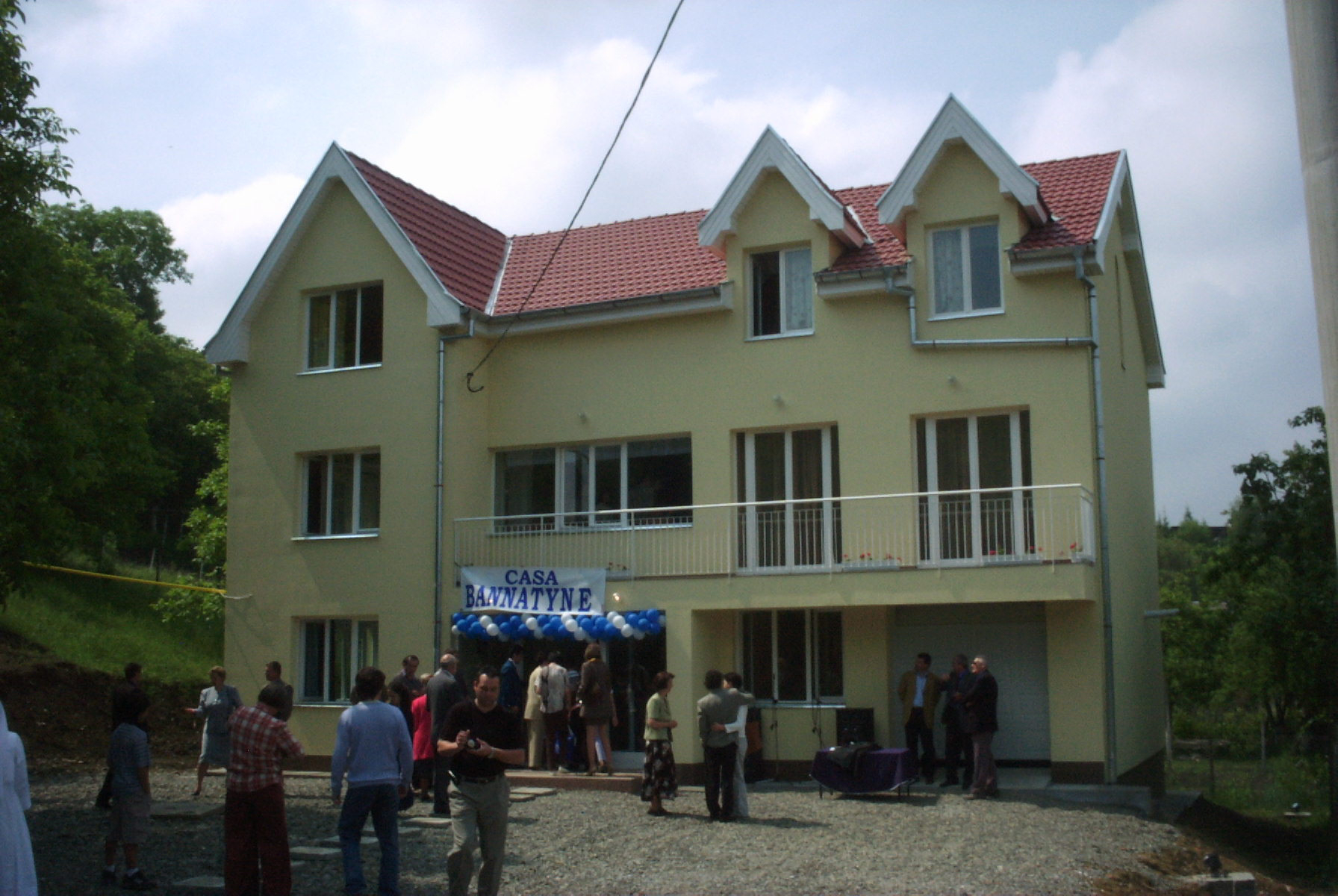
Casa Bannatyne opens named after the principal backer – Duncan Bannatyne

Some of SIR's first projects after the Balkan conflict were with the orphans of Eastern Europe – particularly Romania. Here it built and maintained homes for abandoned children many of whom were orphaned by the AIDs epidemic. The first such house was called Iona House – named after the Hebridean Island where one of SIR's support groups was based. The orphans were moved from cots in hospitals which they had never left and taken to the house. When they arrived some of them, as old as 7, were so starved of care that they had never even learned to walk, having never been taken out of their cots. The children are now young adults but the homes continue to provide them with the support they need. Mary's Meals operate two other similar homes in Romania.

==== Sponsor A School ====
The Sponsor A School campaign is another project carried out by Mary's Meals. Sponsor A School involves an individual or group meeting the costs of feeding children at any given school. The campaign runs in Malawi and Liberia. All those who sponsor a school have a plaque featuring text of their choice erected at the school and a document giving the school's profile.

== Sustainability ==
Mary's Meals buys locally sourced food – which helps boost local economies – and provides it in a sustainable way with a view of the overall development of the countries it works in. The idea is to empower the skilled and educated young population in developing countries that can only benefit the country's economy and help break the poverty cycle. Mary's Meals takes a long-term view, but all its projects are aimed at eventual self-sufficiency in the communities in which it operates.

== Fundraising ==
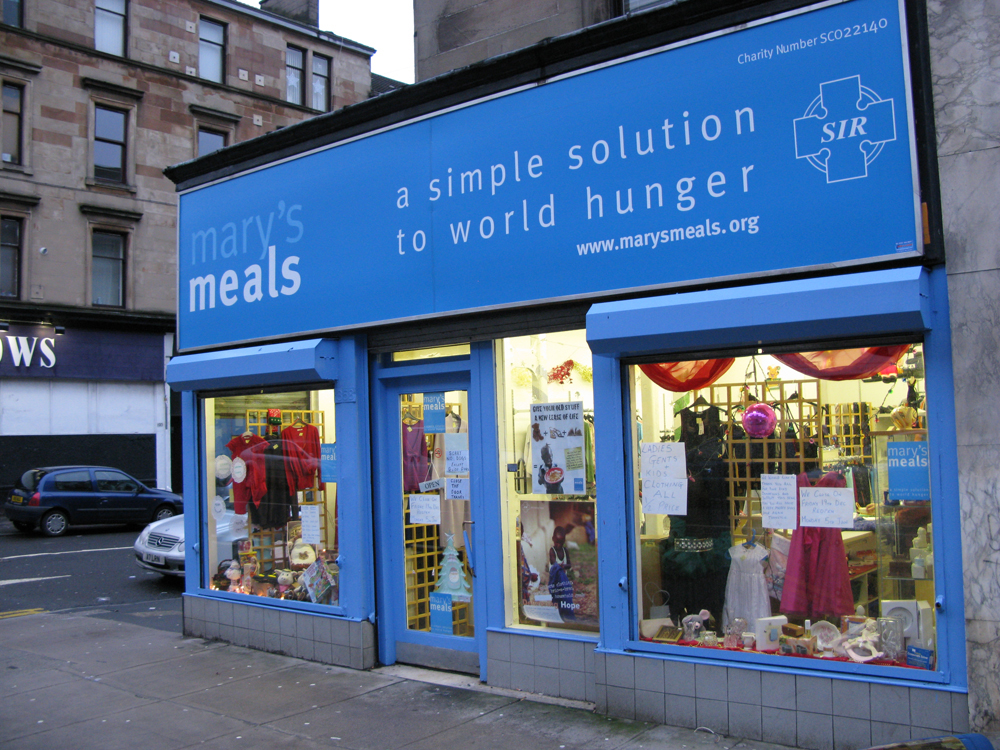
A Mary's Meals charity shop

Although Mary's Meals is an international charity, it is still the UK in which the charity has the largest infrastructure of supporters in place. Support groups meet and hold events in towns and cities in the UK. Parishes and businesses have adopted the charity in many areas. Mary's Meals also has several charity shops in various UK locations. In the last few years Mary's Meals has sought to extend its support beyond the borders of the UK. Mary's Meals now have supporter bases in America, Australia, Austria, Germany, Croatia, Ireland, Italy and Bosnia-Herzegovina. These bases raise money and awareness for the charity in their areas. Some take part in The Backpack Project and all fundraise for Mary's Meals.

=== World Porridge Day ===
World Porridge Day is an annual fundraising campaign held on 10 October to raise awareness for Mary's Meals to aid starving children in developing countries. It has been observed since 2009. The inaugural event included gatherings in the United States, France, Malawi, Bosnia and Sweden. Some countries it works in include Haiti, Burma, India, Kenya, Zambia, Liberia, and Thailand. In 2009, the organisation was feeding over 300,000 children a day. Stoats Porridge Bars was the official World Porridge Day partner in 2016. The World Porridge Making Championship has taken place alongside the day since 2009.

== See also ==
- Medjugorje
- Our Lady of Medjugorje
