= People of the Year Awards =

The People of the Year Awards was an annual award show in Ireland. Organised by the Rehab Group, it was televised by Raidió Teilifís Éireann (RTÉ).

The Awards provided a unique opportunity for the Irish public to honour outstanding contributions made by individuals and organisations to life in Ireland.

The 2018 edition took place on Sunday 15 April and was hosted by Gráinne Seoige and Aidan Power. No ceremony was planned for 2019.

== Notable winners ==
- Adrian Donohoe
- Ifrah Ahmed
- Willie Bermingham
- Maeve Binchy
- Panti Bliss
- Mary Dunlop
- Bob Geldof
- Veronica Guerin
- Pádraig Harrington
- Seamus Heaney
- Christy Moore
- John Hume
- Brian Keenan
- Ronan Kerr
- Rory McIlroy
- George J. Mitchell
- Mo Mowlam
- Daráine Mulvihill
- Niall Quinn
- Keith Duffy
- Nuala O'Loan
- John O'Shea (humanitarian)
- Joe Dolan
- Gerry Ryan
- Katie Taylor
- Catherine Corless
- Tony Scott
- Tomi Reichental
