= List of baronetcies in the Baronetage of the United Kingdom: M =

Peerages and baronetcies of Britain and Ireland
Extant	All
Dukes	Dukedoms
Marquesses	Marquessates
Earls	Earldoms
Viscounts	Viscountcies
Barons	Baronies
Baronets	Baronetcies
En, Ire, NS, GB, UK (extinct)

This is a list of baronetcies in the Baronetage of the United Kingdom. They have been created since 1801 when they replaced the baronetages in the Baronetage of Great Britain, and Baronetage of Ireland. This list is not currently complete.

Title	Date of creation	Surname	Current status	Notes
Macalister of Tarbert	1924	Macalister	extinct 1934	
Macara of Ardmore	1911	Macara	extant	
MacCormac of Harley Street	1897	MacCormac	extinct 1901	
Macdonald of East Sheen	1813	Macdonald	extinct 1919	
Macdonnell of Kilsharvan	1872	Macdonnell	extinct 1875	
MacGregor of Ballimore	1828	MacGregor	extant	
Mackenzie of Glen Muick	1890	Mackenzie	dormant	fourth Baronet died 1993 - under review
Mackenzie of Kilcoy	1836	Mackenzie	extinct 1883	
Mackeson of Hythe	1954	Mackeson	extant	
Mackie of Corraith	1920	Mackie	extinct 1924	
Mackinnon of Strathaird and Loup	1889	Mackinnon	extinct 1893	
Mackintosh of Halifax	1935	Mackintosh	extant	first Baronet created Viscount Mackintosh of Halifax in 1957
Mackintosh of Mackintosh	1812	Mackintosh	extinct 1820	
Mackworth-Praed of Owsden Hall	1905	Mackworth-Praed	extinct 1921	
Maclay of Glasgow	1914	Maclay	extant	first Baronet created Baron Maclay in 1922
Maclean of Strachur and Glensluain	1957	Maclean	extant	
Macleod of The Fairfields	1925	Macleod	extant	
Macleod of Fuinary	1924	Macleod	extant	
Maclure of Headbourne Worthy	1898	Maclure	extant	
Macmaster of Glengarry	1921	Macmaster	extinct 1922	
Macnab of Dundurn Castle	1858	Macnab	extinct 1862	
Macnaghten of Dundarave	1836	Workman-Macnaghten, Macnaghten	extant	
Macnaghten	1836	Macnaghten	extinct 1841	
Macpherson-Grant of Ballindalloch and Invereshie	1838	Macpherson-Grant	extinct 1983	
Macpherson of Banchor	1933	Macpherson	extant	first Baronet created Baron Strathcarron in 1936
Macready of Cheltenham	1923	Macready	extant	
MacRobert of Douneside	1922	MacRobert	extinct 1941	
Mactaggart of King's Park	1938	Mactaggart	extant	
Madden of Kells	1919	Madden	extant	Unproven
Madge of St Margaret's Bay	1919	Madge	extinct 1962	
Magnay of Postford House	1844	Magnay	extinct 1960	Lord Mayor of London
Magnus of Tangley Hill	1917	Magnus	extant	
Mahon of Castlegar	1819	Mahon	extant	
Mainwaring of Over Peover	1804	Mainwaring	extinct 1934	
Maitland of Clifton Hall	1818	Maitland	dormant	tenth Baronet died 1994
Makins of Rotherfield Court	1903	Makins	extinct 1999	
Mallaby-Deeley of Mitcham Court	1922	Mallaby-Deeley	extinct 1962	
Mallinson of Walthamstow	1935	Mallinson	extant	
Mander of The Mount	1911	Mander	extant	See Mander family
Mann of Thelveton Hall	1905	Mann	extant	
Manningham-Buller of Dilhorne Hall	1866	Manningham-Buller	extant	fourth Baronet created Viscount Dilhorne in 1964
Maple of Childwick Bury	1897	Maple	extinct 1903	
Mappin of Thornbury	1886	Mappin	extinct 1975	
Marjoribanks of Guisachan	1866	Marjoribanks	extinct 1935	first Baronet created Baron Tweedmouth in 1881
Marjoribanks of Lees	1815	Marjoribanks	extinct 1888	
Markham of Arusha	1911	Markham	extant	
Marling of Stanley Park	1882	Marling	extant	
Marr of Sunderland	1919	Marr	extant	
Marsden of Grimsby	1924	Marsden	extant	
Marsh of Dublin	1839	Marsh	extinct 1860	
Martin of Cappagh	1885	Martin	extinct 1901	
Martin of Overbury Court	1905	Martin	extinct 1916	
Mason of Compton Pauncefoot	1918	Mason	extinct 1988	first Baronet created Baron Blackford in 1935
Matheson of Lochalsh	1882	Matheson	extant	
Matheson of the Lews and Achany	1850	Matheson	extinct 1878	
Mathews of London	1917	Mathews	extinct 1920	
Mathias of Vaendre Hall	1917	Mathias	extinct 1991	
Constable-Maxwell-Scott of Abbotsford	1932	Constable-Maxwell-Scott	extinct 1954	
Maxwell of Cardonoss	1804	Maxwell	extinct 1924	
May of The Eyot	1931	May	extant	first Baronet created Baron May in 1935
McAlpine of Knott Park	1918	McAlpine	extant	fifth Baronet had already been created a life peer as Baron McAlpine of Moffat in 1980, before succeeding to the Baronetcy in 1983; the life peerage became extinct on his death in 1990
McClure of Belmont	1874	McClure	extinct 1893	
McConnell of The Moat	1900	McConnell	extant	Lord Mayor of Belfast
McCowan of Dalwhat	1934	McCowan	dormant	second Baronet died 1965
McCullagh of Lismarra	1935	McCullagh	extinct 1974	
McEwen of Marchmont and Bardrochat	1953	McEwen	extant	
McFarland of Aberfoyle	1914	McFarland	extant	
McGrigor of Campden Hill	1831	McGrigor	extant	
McIver of Sarisbury	1896	McIver	extinct 1920	
McKenny	1831	McKenny	extinct 1866	
McLaren of Bodnant, Gwylgre and Hilders	1902	McLaren	extant	first Baronet created Baron Aberconway in 1911; baronetcy unproven (third Baronet died 2003) - under review
McLintock of Sanquhar	1934	McLintock	extant	
McMahon of Ashley Manor	1817	McMahon	extant	
McMahon of Dublin	1815	McMahon	extinct 1926	
MacTaggart-Stewart of Southwick and Blairderry	1892	MacTaggart-Stewart	extinct 1948	
McTaggart of Ardwell	1841	McTaggart	extinct 1867	
Medlycott of Ven House	1808	Medlycott	extant	
Mellor of Culmhead	1924	Mellor	extinct 1990	
Melvin of Olton	1933	Melvin	extinct 1952	
Meredith of Montreal	1916	Meredith	extinct 1929	
Metcalfe of Chilton	1802	Metcalfe	extinct 1979	third Baronet created Baron Metcalfe in 1845, which title became extinct in 1846
Methuen of Haslemere	1916	Methuen	extinct 1924	
Meux of Theobald's Park	1831	Meux	extinct 1900	
Meyer of Shortgrove	1910	Meyer	extant	
Meyrick of Bush	1880	Meyrick	extant	unproven (fourth Baronet died 2004)
Meysey-Thompson of Kirby Hall	1874	Meysey-Thompson	dormant	second Baronet created Baron Knaresborough in 1905, which title became extinct in 1920; third Baronet died 1967
Micklethwait of Iridge Place	1838	Micklethwait	extinct 1853	
Middlebrook of Oakwell	1930	Middlebrook	extinct 1971	
Middlemore of Selly Oak	1919	Middlemore	extinct 1987	
Middleton of Crowfield	1804	Middleton	extinct 1860	
Milbank of Barningham Park	1882	Milbank	extant	
Milburn of Guyzance	1905	Milburn	extant	
Miles of Leigh Court	1859	Miles	extant	
Millais of Downgate	1885	Millais	extant	
Miller of Manderston	1874	Miller	extinct 1918	
Mills of Alcester	1953	Mills	extant	first Baronet created Viscount Mills in 1962
Mills of Ebbw Vale	1921	Mills	extant	
Mills of Hillingdon Court and Camelford House	1868	Mills	extinct 1982	second Baronet created Baron Hillingdon in 1887
Milne-Watson of Ashley	1937	Milne-Watson	extant	
Milne of Inveresk	1876	Milne	extinct 1938	
Milnes of Gauley	1801	Milnes	extinct 1841	
Mitchell-Thomson of Polmood	1900	Mitchell-Thomson	extant	Lord Provost of Edinburgh; second Baronet created Baron Selsdon in 1932
Mitchell of Tulliallan	1945	Mitchell	extinct 1983	
Mitchelson of Rotherfield	1920	Mitchelson	extinct 1945	
Moir of Whitehanger	1916	Moir	extant	
Molony of Dublin	1925	Molony	dormant	second Baronet died in 1976
Moncreiff of Tullibole	1871	Moncreiff	extant	first Baronet created Baron Moncreiff in 1874; in 1883 he also succeeded to the Moncreiff Baronetcy of Moncreiff, created in the Baronetage of Nova Scotia in 1685. Baronetcy unproven (5th baronet died 2002) - under review
Mond of Hartford Hill	1910	Mond	extant	first Baronet created Baron Melchett in 1928
Monro of Bearcrofts	1920	Monro	extinct 1928	
Monson of Thatched House Lodge	1905	Monson	extinct 1969	
Montagu of Swaythling	1894	Montagu	extant	first Baronet created Baron Swaythling in 1907
Montefiore of the Isle of Thanet	1846	Montefiore	extinct 1885	
Montefiore of Worth Park	1886	Montefiore	extinct 1935	
Montgomery of Stanhope	1801	Montgomery	extant	
Montgomery of The Hall	1808	Montgomery	extinct 1939	
Moon of Copsewood Grange	1887	Moon	dormant	fourth Baronet died 1979 - under review
Moore of Colchester	1923	Moore	extinct 1992	Lord Mayor of London
Moore of Hancox	1919	Moore	extant	President of the Royal College of Physicians
Moore of Kyleburn	1956	Moore	extinct 1971	
Moore of Moore Lodge	1932	Moore	extant	
Morgan of Green Street and Lincoln's Inn	1892	Morgan	extinct 1897	
Morgan of Whitehall Court	1906	Morgan	extinct 1916	Lord Mayor of London
Morris of Cavendish Square	1909	Morris	extinct 1926	
Morris of Clasemont	1806	Morris	dormant	ninth Baronet died 1982
Morris of Spiddal	1885	Morris	extant	first Baronet created Baron Killanin in 1900
Morris of Nuffield	1929	Morris	extinct 1963	first Baronet created Viscount Nuffield in 1938
Morrison-Bell of Harpford	1923	Morrison-Bell	extinct 1956	
Morrison-Bell of Otterburn Hall	1905	Morrison-Bell	extant	
Mott of Ditchling	1930	Mott	extant	
Mount of Wasing	1921	Mount	extant	
Mountain of Oare Manor and Brendon	1922	Mountain	extant	
Mowat of Cleckheaton	1932	Mowat	extinct 1968	
Mowbray of Mortimer	1880	Mowbray	extant	
Moynihan of Carr Manor	1922	Moynihan	extant	first Baronet created Baron Moynihan in 1929
Muir-Mackenzie of Delvine	1805	Muir-Mackenzie	extant	
Muir of Deanston and Park Gardens	1892	Muir	dormant	Lord Provost of Glasgow; third Baronet died 1995
Mulholland of Ballyscullion Park	1945	Mulholland	extant	second Baronet succeeded as Baron Dunleath in 1993
Munro-Lucas-Tooth of Bught	1920	Munro-Lucas-Tooth, Lucas-Tooth	extant	
Munro of Libertis	1825	Munro	extant	
Muntz of Clifton-on-Dunsmore	1902	Muntz	extinct 1940	
Murchison of Belgrave Square	1866	Murchison	extinct 1871	
Murphy of Altadore	1903	Murphy	extinct 1922	
Murphy of Wyckham	1912	Murphy	extinct 1963	
Musgrave of Drumglass	1897	Musgrave	extinct 1904	
Musgrove of Speldhurst and Russell Square	1851	Musgrove	extinct 1881	Lord Mayor of London
Muspratt of Merseyside	1922	Muspratt	extinct 1934	
Myers	3 July 1804	Myers	extinct 1811	
Mynors of Treago	1964	Mynors	extant	
