= Nugent baronets =

Set index for Nugent baronets

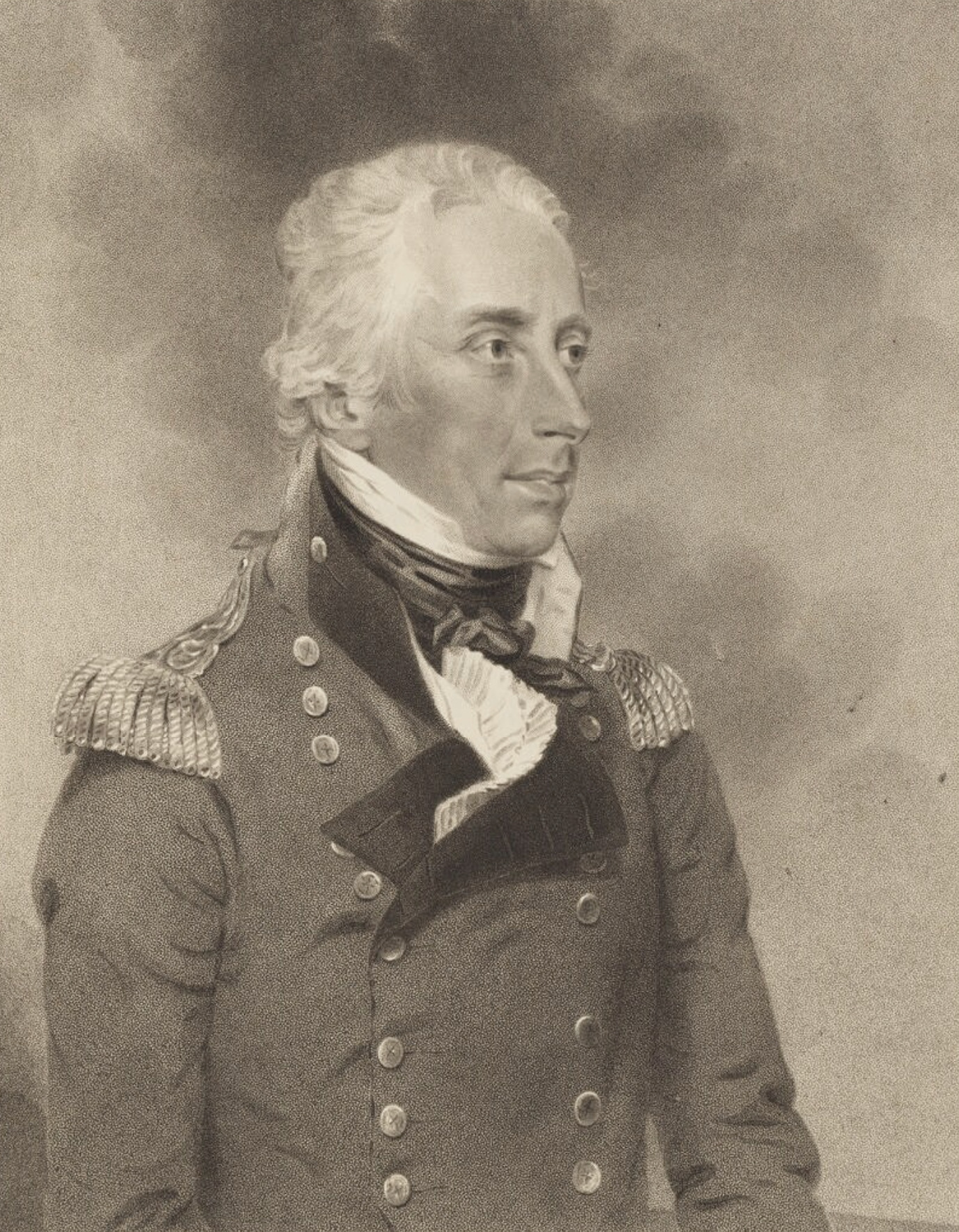
Sir George Nugent, 1st Baronet, of Waddesdon.

There have been nine baronetcies held by people with the surname Nugent, four in the Baronetage of Ireland and five in the Baronetage of the United Kingdom. Six of the creations are extinct, while three are extant.

- Nugent baronets of Moyrath (1622)
- Nugent Baronets of Donore (first creation, 1768)
- Nugent baronets of Dysert (1782)
- O'Reilly baronets of Ballinlough (1795), later Nugent baronets
- Nugent baronets of Waddesdon (1806)
- Humble baronets of Cloncoskoran (1831), later Nugent baronets
- Nugent baronets of Donore (second creation, 1831)
- Nugent baronets of Dunsfold (1960): see Richard Nugent, Baron Nugent of Guildford
- Nugent baronets of Portaferry (1961): see Roland Nugent
