= James McGrigor =

James McGrigor may refer to:

- Sir Jamie McGrigor, 6th Baronet (1949–2025), Scottish politician
- Sir James Rhoderic Duff McGrigor, 3rd Baronet (1857–1924) of the McGrigor baronets
- Sir James McGrigor, 1st Baronet (1771–1858), Scottish physician, military surgeon, botanist and baronet

== See also ==
- James McGregor (disambiguation)
- James MacGregor (disambiguation)
