= James McGregor =

James McGregor may refer to:

- James McGregor (footballer) (fl. 1901–1910), Scottish footballer (Grimsby Town)
- James L. McGregor (born 1953), American author, journalist, and China analyst
- James Drummond McGregor (1838–1918), Canadian businessman, politician, and lieutenant governor of Nova Scotia
- James Duncan McGregor (1860–1935), Canadian politician
- James Lewin McGregor (1921–1988), mathematician
- James Russell McGregor (died 1973), leader of the Black Muslims
- James McGregor (minister), Scotch-Irish Presbyterian minister
- Jim McGregor (born 1948), former Republican member of the Ohio House of Representatives
- Jim McGregor (Scottish author)

== See also ==
- James MacGregor (disambiguation)
- James McGrigor (disambiguation)
