= McDonald & Co =

McDonald & Co. is U.S. investment firm.

McDonald & Co may also refer to:

- McDonald & Co, an imprint of Little, Brown Book Group
- McDonald & Co, a successor company of Alexander McDonald (sculptor)

== See also ==
- Macdonald (disambiguation)
