= Medico-Botanical Society of London =

The Medico-Botanical Society of London (or the Royal Medico-Botanical Society of London) was a society founded in 1821 by John Frost, as director, for the avowed purpose of "investigating, by means of communications, lectures, and experiments, the medicinal properties of plants ... of promoting the study of the vegetable materia medica of all countries ... and of cultivating medical plants." The Society's meetings were held at 32, Sackville Street. The first president was William George Maton, MD, FRS. His successors as president were Robert Bree, MD, FRS, the surgeon Sir James McGrigor, FRS, and Philip Henry Stanhope, 4th Earl Stanhope, FRS.

Frost obtained not only the chief men of science of his day as members, but also politicians and men of letters; it is said that he had twelve Sovereigns on the list of members. His mode of obtaining these names was to present an elaborate album containing the signatures of the members to any distinguished man he wanted to catch, and to inform him that he had been elected as an honorary member.

In 1830 the Society abolished its office of Director and expelled John Frost because of his unpopular, presumptuous conduct and displays of vanity.

It was during the presidency of the Earl of Stanhope (1829–1837) that Frost was expelled from the society (1830) for arrogant behaviour. Mathematician Charles Babbage (1791–1871), the 'father of computing', wrote scathingly of the incident in 1830 as symptomatic of the decline of science in England and observed that the society seemed more interested in recruiting the aristocracy of Europe.

The Transactions of the Royal Medico-Botanical Society of London were issued in three parts covering three intervals: 1821 to 1829; 1832 to 1833; and 1834 to 1837.

The 4th Earl Stanhope was one of the main supporters of the Society, and it ceased to exist soon after his death in 1855.
