= Clive Mackintosh, 3rd Viscount Mackintosh of Halifax =

British chartered accountant and peer (born 1958)

The Right Honourable The Viscount Mackintosh of Halifax FCA

Member of the House of Lords
- Lord Temporal
- In office 2 November 1980 – 11 November 1999
- Preceded by: The 2nd Viscount Mackintosh of Halifax
- Succeeded by: Seat abolished (Note: Pursuant to the House of Lords Act 1999.)

Personal details
- Born: John Clive Mackintosh; 9 September 1958 (age 66)
- Political party: Conservative

John Clive Mackintosh, 3rd Viscount Mackintosh of Halifax (born 9 September 1958), is a British chartered accountant and hereditary peer.

== Early life and education ==
Mackintosh was born in 1958, the elder son of John Mackintosh, 2nd Viscount Mackintosh of Halifax, and his second wife Gwynneth Charlesworth Gledhill.

He was educated at The Leys School and Oriel College, Oxford, from which he graduated with an MA in philosophy, politics and economics.

== Career ==
Mackintosh inherited the viscountcy and barony and a seat in the House of Lords upon the death of his father in 1980. He remained in the House of Lords until 1999, when he lost his seat after the passing of the House of Lords Act 1999.

Mackintosh is a chartered accountant. He was a partner of PricewaterhouseCoopers in 1992 and was appointed Fellow of the Institute of Chartered Accountants in England and Wales (FCA) in 1995.

== Marriages and children ==
Mackintosh was married firstly to Elizabeth Lakin on 10 June 1982. They had two sons:

- Hon. Thomas Harold George Mackintosh (born 8 February 1985), heir apparent to the peerages.
- Hon. George John Frank Mackintosh (born 24 October 1988)

Following a divorce in 1994, he was married secondly to Claire Jane Nowak on 12 June 1995. They have one daughter:

- Hon. Violet Krystyna Jane Mackintosh (born 5 October 2000).

== Coat of arms ==
Coat of arms of Clive Mackintosh, 3rd Viscount Mackintosh of Halifax
Crest Upon a rock Proper charged with two roses Argent barbed and seeded a cat sejant also Proper. Escutcheon Or on a chevron between two lions rampant in chief and a lymphad in base Sable a bezant charged with a representation of the head of St John the Baptist Proper between two hearts of the field. Supporters On either side a squirrel Proper about the neck a cord and pendent therefrom a purse both Or. Motto By Faith And By Work.

== Notes ==
Peerage of the United Kingdom
Preceded by John Mackintosh	Viscount Mackintosh of Halifax; 1980–present Member of the House of Lords (1980–1999)	Incumbent heir apparent: Hon. Thomas Mackintosh
Preceded by John Mackintosh	Baron Mackintosh of Halifax; 1980–present	Incumbent heir apparent: Hon. Thomas Mackintosh
Baronetage of the United Kingdom
Preceded by John Mackintosh	Baronet of Halifax; 1980–present	Incumbent heir apparent: Hon. Thomas Mackintosh
