= John Frost (physician) =

Dr John Frost FRSE FSA (1803–1840) was a short-lived but influential medical doctor and botanist who founded the Medico-Botanical Society of London, studying and cataloguing the medicinal properties of plants. He was a controversial and flamboyant figure of the early 19th century.

== Life ==
He was born in 1803 in the Charing Cross area of London. He was born two months premature and a twin and was a delicate child. He attended school in Langley, Berkshire. He was then sent as an apprentice to Dr Wright, the apothecary at Bethlem Royal Hospital. In 1821 he left and resolved to establish a national study of Materia Medica, leading to his foundation of the Medico-Botanical Society of London.

Having been introduced by Dr Bree to King George IV, he was placed as botanical tutor to Prince George of Cumberland and Cambridge (later to become George V of Hanover). Dr Bree also introduced Frost to Sir James McGrigor of the army medical board, who was elected first president of the Medico-Botanical Society, whilst Frost served as director. The society proved a huge success and numbered in its members eleven sovereigns of Europe, the entire British royal family, over twenty members of other royal families and almost all foreign ambassadors in London, together with many learned men of the medical world. Frost reportedly carried around an autograph book containing all these famous persons in a single volume.

He collected or was given over 7000 botanical specimens for his project. He was then invited to be the official lecturer on botany at the Royal Institution in London and was made a Fellow of the Linnean Society. He was, however, refused fellowship of the Royal Society of London, perhaps viewing his position one of luck and self-creation rather than skill. Frost further aggravated this relationship by sending a rude letter to the secretary of the society.

At the proposal of Dr Maton, from 1824 to 1830 he served as secretary to the Royal Humane Society in London. Aged only 21, he was their youngest-ever secretary. He lived on their premises at Bridge Street in the Blackfriars district.

In 1827 he won the Medico-Botanical Society's gold medal for his report on the medical properties of Ipecacuanha with the silver medal going to John Peter Yosy (presumably his brother-in-law) for his paper on Menyanthes Trifiliata (Buckbean). Yosy was the Secretary of the Society.

In 1828 he was elected a Fellow of the Royal Society of Edinburgh his proposer being Robert Graham.

In 1828 Earl Stanhope succeeded James McGrigor as second President of Frost's Society. This precipitated a series of disasters. Earl Stanhope being unavailable for his first address to the Society, Frost (who was apparently very vain) took it upon himself to adorn all the various medals and regalia of the President to give a speech to the Society on the 7th of September 1829. This was considered highly inappropriate and word quickly reached Earl Stanhope and his representatives. On 8 January 1830 Earl Stanhope presiding, the Society announced the post of Director abolished, thereby ousting Frost from his own society!

In 1830 he received the patronage of the Duke of Cumberland as his personal physician and resigned his envious role as Secretary of the Royal Humane Society. However, rumour reached the Duke that Frost was unreliable, and the duke terminated his position, leaving Frost in a total loss of employment or income.

Undeterred, in 1831 he established a new St John's Hospital at St John's Gate, Clerkenwell which he ran. He also joined the Royal Sailing Society.

In 1832 he received permission from the Admiralty to use the retired ship HMS Chanticleer as a hospital ship, moored off Millbank and aimed to serve the needs of retired Thames boatmen. In this venture King William IV served as Patron, the Duke of Leinster as president. The board of directors included the Duke of Bedford, Duke of Buccleuch, Earl of Clarendon, Admiral Lord J O'Bryen and Admiral Gambier, proving that Frost still had many connections in upper British society. However, he ran up huge debts which could not be repaid and he fled to Paris in 1833 adopting the pseudonym of John FitzJames. He stayed here less than a year and moved to Berlin adopting the title Sir John Frost (but he was never knighted). Some sources say he was a knight of the obscure Brazilian Order of the Southern Star. If so, it may link to his work on Ipecacuanha.

He died in Berlin on 17 March 1840 following a "long and painful illness".

== Family ==
He was married to Harriet Yosy, only daughter of Madame Yosy, author of Switzerland and its Costumes. They had no children.

== Publications ==
The standard author abbreviation J.Frost is used to indicate this person as the author when citing a botanical name.

- The Science of Botany (1827)
