= Harold Mackintosh, 1st Viscount Mackintosh of Halifax =

British businessman, public servant and benefactor

The Right Honourable The Viscount Mackintosh of Halifax KCB JP DL
- Portrait of Lord Mackintosh by Cowan Dobson

Chancellor of the University of East Anglia
- In office 1962–1964
- Preceded by: First holder
- Succeeded by: The Lord Franks

Member of the House of Lords
- Lord Temporal
- In office 1 January 1948 – 27 December 1964
- Preceded by: Peerage created
- Succeeded by: The 2nd Viscount Mackintosh of Halifax

Personal details
- Born: Harold Vincent Mackintosh; 8 June 1891 Halifax, West Yorkshire
- Died: 27 December 1964 (aged 73) Norwich, Norfolk
- Spouse: Constance Emily Stoneham (m. 1916)
- Children: 3
- Parent(s): John and Violet Mackintosh
- Education: Halifax New School

Military service
- Branch/service: Royal Naval Reserve
- Battles/wars: World War I

Harold Vincent Mackintosh, 1st Viscount Mackintosh of Halifax (8 June 1891 – 27 December 1964), was a British businessman, public servant and benefactor.

== Early life ==
Mackintosh was born in Halifax, West Riding of Yorkshire, the son of John and Violet Mackintosh who had a toffee factory on Queens Road in Halifax, then Albion Mills and also in the United States, Canada, Germany and Australia. He was educated at Halifax New School. Instead of going to university, he spent a few years in Krefeld in North Rhine-Westphalia, Germany, where he ran a Mackintosh toffee factory, and learnt the language. He was a member of the German international hockey team, prior to the First World War. During the First World War, he joined the Royal Naval Volunteer Reserve and reached the rank of lieutenant.

== Career ==
Mackintosh was the owner of the confectionery business of John Mackintosh & Sons Ltd from 1920 when his father died of a heart attack. The company John Mackintosh & Sons Ltd was floated in March 1921. He was involved in the amalgamation of a group of Halifax building societies into the Halifax Building Society in 1928. In September 1931, he narrowly avoided merging the company with Rowntrees of York. Both companies already had a joint subsidiary in the Republic of Ireland.

As a result of a lunchtime meeting at the Savoy Hotel, he bought the A. J. Caley confectionery company in Norwich from Unilever in 1932. The Caleys site is now the Chapelfield shopping centre. This takeover of Caleys helped the Mackintosh company to expand its range of products notably changing its reliance on toffee to products with chocolate toffee such as Quality Street in 1936 and Rolo. To launch Quality Street, he had a full-page advertisement on the front of the Daily Mail on 2 May 1936. His brother Eric managed the Caleys factory. He was Chairman of the National Savings Committee from 1943, becoming president in 1958. In 1956, under his leadership, National Savings introduced Premium Bonds. He served as Chancellor of the University of East Anglia between 1962 and 1964.

== Other interests ==
Mackintosh was a devout Methodist. He was a keen supporter of the Sunday School Movement, becoming President of the National Sunday School Union from 3 May 1924 until 1925, then World Sunday School Association. In December 1927 he became President of the Yorkshire Agricultural Society. In 1960 he became President of the Royal Norfolk Agricultural Association. From 1942 to 1946, he was President of the Advertising Association. He also supported the British Empire Cancer Campaign. He had a large collection of Toby jugs, and had an extensive knowledge of Ralph Wood and Staffordshire pottery.

His portrait, by the famous Scottish portrait artist Cowan Dobson is held at the University of East Anglia at Norwich.

== Honours ==
Mackintosh was knighted in the 1922 New Year Honours, when only 31, one of the youngest people to be knighted in the 20th century, for his work with Sunday schools. He was made a baronet in the 1935 New Year Honours and was raised to the peerage in the 1948 New Year Honours as Baron Mackintosh of Halifax, of Hethersett in the County of Norfolk. In the 1957 Birthday Honours, he was further honoured when he was made Viscount Mackintosh of Halifax, of Hethersett in the County of Norfolk. In 1948, he was given an honorary LLD by the University of Leeds. On Unthank Road in Norwich is Harold Mackintosh House.

== Marriage and children ==
On 8 June 1916, Mackintosh married Constance Emily Stoneham, the second daughter of Edgar Cooper Stoneham. She was born on the same day as him. They had two children:

- John Mackintosh, 2nd Viscount Mackintosh of Halifax (7 October 1921 – 2 November 1980)
- Hon. Mary Mackintosh (18 April 1927 – 19 January 2006)

His son John attended Trinity College in Hartford, Connecticut, as he felt no British university was prepared to the necessary standard in business administration.

From 1934 to 1942, Lord Mackintosh lived at Conynghan Hall near Harrogate. Then they lived at Greystones in Luddenden. In 1947, he moved to Thickthorn Hall, south-west of Norwich.

== Death ==
Lord Mackintosh died at Thickthorn Hall in December 1964 at the age of 73 and was succeeded in the viscountcy and other titles by his only son, John. He left £218,404 in his will.

Lady Mackintosh died in 1975.

== Publications ==
- Early English Figure Pottery, 1938

Coat of arms of Harold Mackintosh, 1st Viscount Mackintosh of Halifax
Crest Upon a rock Proper charged with two roses Argent barbed and seeded a cat sejant also Proper. Escutcheon Or on a chevron between two lions rampant in chief and a lymphad in base Sable a bezant charged with a representation of the head of St John the Baptist Proper between two hearts of the field. Supporters On either side a squirrel Proper about the neck a cord and pendent therefrom a purse both Or. Motto By Faith And By Work.

Academic offices
New office	Chancellor of the University of East Anglia; 1962–1964	Succeeded by The Lord Franks
Peerage of the United Kingdom
New creation	Viscount Mackintosh of Halifax; 1957–1964	Succeeded by John Mackintosh
New creation	Baron Mackintosh of Halifax; 1948–1964; Member of the House of Lords (1948–1964)	Succeeded by John Mackintosh
Baronetage of the United Kingdom
New creation	Baronet of Halifax; 1935–1964	Succeeded by John Mackintosh
