= Meux baronets =

Set index for Meux baronets

There have been two baronetcies created for persons with the surname Meux, one in the Baronetage of England and one in the Baronetage of the United Kingdom. Both are extinct.

- Meux baronets of Kingston (1641)
- Meux baronets of Theobald's Park (1831)
