= David McGregore =

American clergyman (1710–1777)

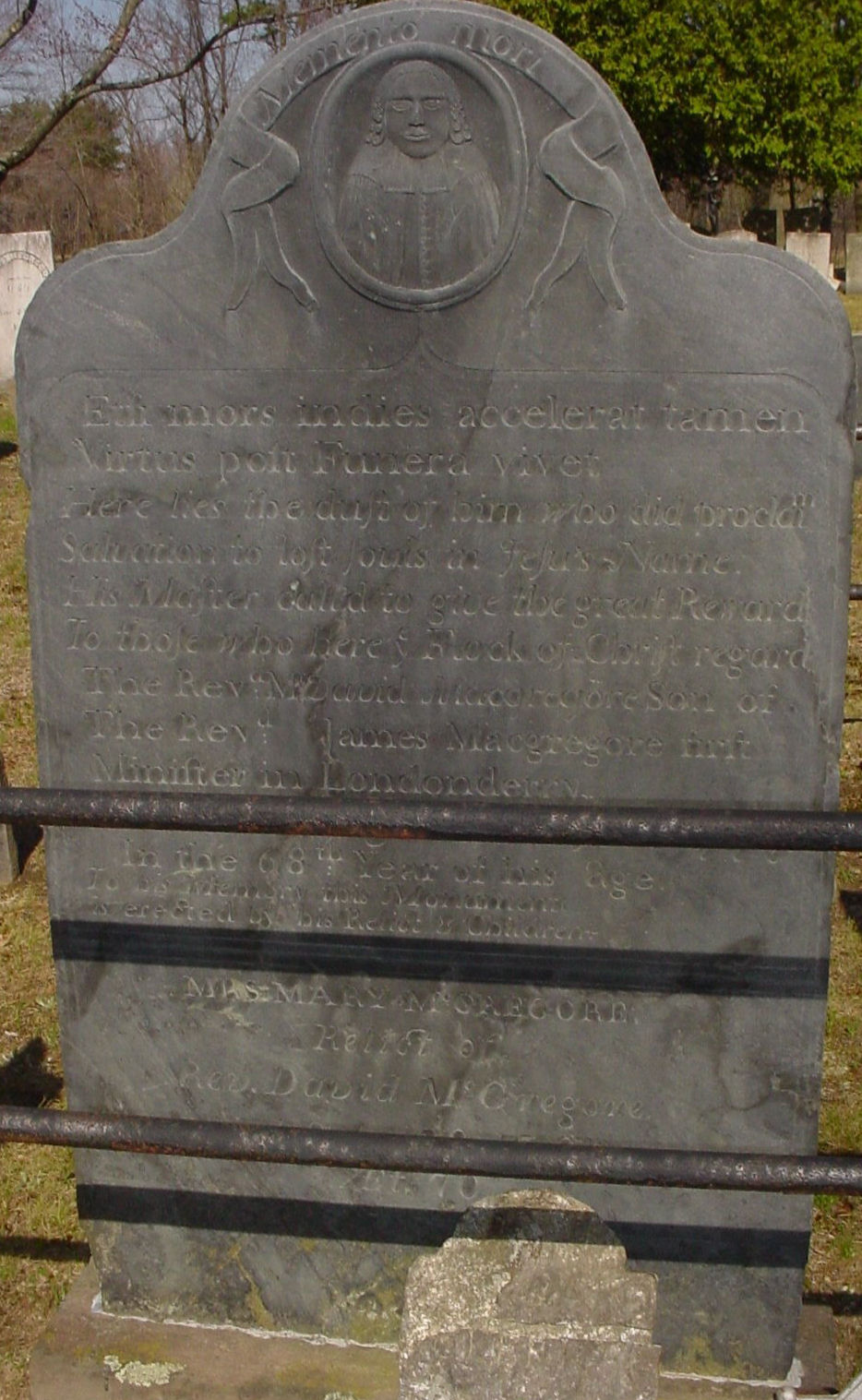
- David McGregore's Tombstone
- Born: 1710; Derry, Ireland
- Died: May 30, 1777 (aged 66–67); Londonderry, New Hampshire
- Other names: MacGregore, McGregore
- Spouse: Mary Boyd
- Parent(s): James McGregore & Maryanne Cargill

Ecclesiastical career
- Church: Presbyterian
- Ordained: 1732

David McGregore (November 6, 1710 – May 30, 1777), also known as McGregor, MacGregore or MacGregor, was a Presbyterian Minister and Member of the Colonial America Christian Clergy. His father, James McGregore, led his family and congregation of Scotch-Irish immigrants to America on five ships in 1718 and settled in a part of New Hampshire called Nutfield, which covers the modern towns of Derry, Londonderry, and Windham. Rev. David McGregor's sermons were very much ahead of his time and sheds light on the religious sentiments of colonial New England. He questioned the old scriptures and seems to have believed in experimenting in new beliefs and new forms of religion, which was considered very revolutionary for his time.

McGregor was the first minister of the West Parish of Derry and until he died in 1777, forty families from the East Parish worshiped in the West Parish and vice versa, West to East. The residents chose to pay their worship tax to the adjacent town. Seems the problems with the different religious sects truly divided the town. The townspeople would cross paths on the way to worship. People were known to carry their shoes for miles until they got to the church.

On June 3, 1720, at a public meeting it was voted that a small house be built “convenient for the inhabitants to meet in for the worship of God,” and it should be placed “as near to the center of the one hundred and five lots as can be convenience.” Reverend James McGregor claimed “there is just three kinds of songs. There is the very good song, the very bad song, and the song that is neither bad nor good. ‘While Shepherds Watch Their Flocks by Night’ is a very good song, ‘Janie Stoops Down to Buckle Her Shoe’ is a very bad song. But ‘Sue Loves Me and I Loves Sue’ is neither good nor bad.”

== He was known to practice law in at least one instance ==
David MacGregor was in one instance known to have practiced law. Around 1750, a wealthy resident of Portsmouth named Jotham Odiorne received two letters demanding 500 pounds to be left at the western end of the long bridge between Kingston and Chester. The letter threatened to burn Mr. Odiorne’s property and kill his family if the demands were not met. After the money was placed, a reputable citizen of Londonderry, Captain John Mitchell, happened along and dismounted his horse nearby. A guard stationed to watch the loot arrested Captain Mitchell and charged him with the crime. Mitchell protested his innocence and was unable to obtain an attorney for his defense. Even though Captain Mitchell was not a member of Rev. David MacGregor’s church, MacGregor was convinced of Captain Mitchell’s innocence and offered to represent him. Although Rev. MacGregor had no knowledge of court proceedings, he managed to defend Captain Mitchell elegantly and presented a strong argument. The court however convicted Captain Mitchell and fined him one thousand pounds. Because he was unable to pay the fine he was placed in jail until he was released on bail, following exertions of Rev. MacGregor. After some time, new evidence was discovered which proved his innocence and Captain Mitchell was acquitted.

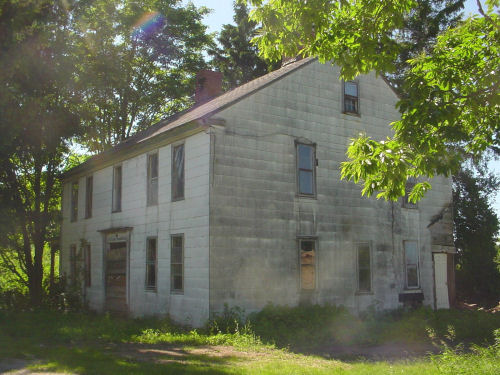
David Mcgregor's Home, built around 1735 demolished in 2006, Photo by William Gorman.

== His sermons ==
- Trial of the Spirits - 1741
- Professors Warned of Their Danger - 1741
- The True Believer’s All Secured - 1747
- The Christian Soldier - 1754
- Address after the Right Hand of Fellowship - 1765
- Christian Unity and Peace - 1765
- An Israelite Indeed - 1774
- The Voice of the Prophets Considered - 1776

"Trial of the Spirits" is a sermon about a controversy involving the Reverend John Wesley and letters from George Whitefield in August 1740. "Professors Warned of their Danger" is directed at ministers of the gospel. It is a guide to the minister of their responsibilities and duties as a teacher of the gospel. It also warns them of the consequences of careless, insensitive and dangerous practices of their teachings. "The True Believer’s All Secured" seems to be aimed at assuring the people of God's promise to take care of the faithful. "The Christian Soldier" is an ordination sermon, and David covers the duties and troubles of being a minister.

== David McGregor’s gravestone ==
Memento mori Etsi mors indies accelerat tamen Virtus post Funera vivet Here lies the dust of him who did proclaim Salvation to lost souls in Jesus’ Name His Master dated to give the great reward To those who here flock of Christ regard The Rev Mr. David MacGregore Son of The Rev. James MacGregore first Minister in Londonderry Deceased the 30th of May AD 1777 In the 68th year of his age To his memory this monument Is erected by his Relict and Children

Mrs. Mary MacGregore Reelect of Rev. David McGregore Died Sept 28, 1793 Aet 70

== David McGregor's notable family and descendants ==
David McGregor's daughter Margaret married Captain James Rogers, brother of the famous Major Robert Rogers of Rogers' Rangers. Rev. McGregor's daughter Mary married Robert Means of Amherst, NH, and through their daughter Elizabeth, who married Jesse Appleton, they were the grandparents of First Lady Jane Means Appleton, wife to President Franklin Pierce.

One son of David McGregor's, Robert McGregor Esquire (1749–1816) built the first bridge over the Merrimack River in August and September 1792. This bridge was known as McGregor's Bridge and crossed the river from near his home in Goffstown on the west side to what is today Bridge Street in Manchester, New Hampshire. Today, McGregor Street parallels the river on the west side along the old Amoskeag Mill building. Another son of David McGregor's, James McGregor (1748–1818) was a New Hampshire state senator representing Rockingham County for two years (1793–1794).

David's father, James McGregor, is thought to be a first cousin of the famous Robert Roy MacGregor. David's grandfather was Colonel David McGregor who was born in Balquhidder, Perthshire, Scotland, the same location of Rob Roy MacGregor's burial. James insisted he was Scottish and not Irish. US Senator John Kerry is also a descendant of David McGregor.
