= James MacGregor =

James MacGregor or Macgregor may refer to:

- James MacGregor (minister) (1829–1894), New Zealand minister
- Jim MacGregor (1887–1950), South African boxer
- James Macgregor (MP) (1808–1858), British MP for Sandwich
- Jimmie Macgregor (born 1930), folk singer and broadcaster
- James MacGregor (moderator) (1832–1910), Moderator of the General Assembly of the Church of Scotland in 1891
- James Drummond MacGregor (1759–1830), Scottish Gaelic poet, abolitionist and Presbyterian minister
- James Gordon MacGregor (1852–1913), Canadian physicist

== See also ==
- James McGregor (disambiguation)
- James McGrigor (disambiguation)
