= Meux baronets of Theobald's Park (1831) =

Escutcheon of the Meux baronets of Theobald's Park

The Meux baronetcy, of Theobald's Park in the County of Hertford, was created in the Baronetage of the United Kingdom on 30 September 1831 for Henry Meux, head of Meux's Brewery. There was a family connection to the Meux baronets of Kingston (1641).

The 2nd Baronet sat as member of parliament for Hertfordshire from 1847 to 1859. The title became extinct on the death, childless, of the 3rd Baronet in 1900.

== Meux baronets, of Theobald's Park (1831) ==
- Sir Henry Meux, 1st Baronet (1770–1841)
- Sir Henry Meux, 2nd Baronet (1817–1883)
- Sir Henry Bruce Meux, 3rd Baronet (1856–1900). Valerie, Lady Meux, wife of the 3rd Baronet, was a well-known socialite. After her husband's death in 1900 she devised a substantial part of her estates to her friend the Honourable Hedworth Lambton, who after Lady Meux's death in 1911 assumed the surname Meux.

== Notes ==
Baronetage of the United Kingdom
Preceded by McKenny baronets	Meux baronets of Theobald's Park; 30 September 1831	Succeeded by Humble baronets
