= Nugent baronets of Dysert (1782) =

The Nugent Baronetcy, of Dysert in the County of Westmeath, was created in the Baronetage of Ireland on 3 December 1782 for Nicholas Nugent. The title became extinct on his death in c. 1813.

== Nugent Baronets, of Dysert (1782) ==
- Sir Nicholas Nugent, 1st Baronet (died c. 1813)
