= Nugent baronets of Donore (second creation, 1831) =

Escutcheon of the Nugent baronets of Donore

The Nugent baronetcy, of Donore in the County of Westmeath, was created in the Baronetage of the United Kingdom on 30 September 1831 for Percy Nugent, a collateral descendant of the holders of the first creation in 1768.

== Nugent Baronets, of Donore (1831) ==
- Sir Percy Fitzgerald Nugent, 1st Baronet (1797–1874)
- Sir Walter George Nugent, 2nd Baronet (1827–1893)
- Sir Percy Thomas Nugent, 3rd Baronet (1861–1896)
- Sir Walter Richard Nugent, 4th Baronet (1865–1955)
- Sir Peter Walter James Nugent, 5th Baronet (1920–2002)
- Sir Walter Richard Middleton Nugent, 6th Baronet (born 1947)

The heir presumptive is the present holder's brother Andrew Robert Nugent (born 1951).

== Note ==
Baronetage of the United Kingdom
Preceded by Humble baronets	Nugent baronets of Donore; 30 September 1831	Succeeded by Otway baronets
