= James McGregor (footballer) =

Scottish footballer

Personal information
- Place of birth: Scotland
- Position: Wing half

Senior career*
Years	Team	Apps	(Gls)
1901–1903	Queen's Park		
1903–1904	Vale of Leven		
1904–1907	Grimsby Town	93	(3)
1907–1910	Glossop	77	(1)
- * Club domestic league appearances and goals

James McGregor was a Scottish professional footballer who played as a wing half.
