= James McGregor (minister) =

- Born: 1677; Magilligan, County Londonderry, Ireland
- Died: 5 March 1729 (aged 51–52); Londonderry, New Hampshire
- Other names: James MacGregor
- Occupation: Presbyterian minister
- Known for: leading the 1718 migration from the Bann Valley
- Spouse: Marion Cargill

Reverend James McGregor was a Scotch-Irish Presbyterian minister who led a migration from the Bann Valley in Ireland, to Nutfield, New Hampshire, in 1718.

== Early life and ancestry ==
McGregor was born c.1677 in Magilligan, County Londonderry, the son of David McGregor. It is unknown whether David McGregor was Scottish himself, or if he had been born in Ireland; regardless, Rev. McGregor was born in Ireland, descended from Scottish settlers. McGregor was, therefore, an Ulster-Scot. There is a story that during the siege of Derry in 1689, when he was a youth, McGregor discharged a cannon announcing the relief was approaching.

== Minister of Aghadowey ==
McGregor was educated in Glasgow, like other Irish Presbyterian ministers, and was ordained at Aghadowey in 1701, succeeding Rev. Thomas Boyd. In 1706, he married Marion Cargill, the daughter of David Cargill, an elder in Aghadowey. In 1704, the Test Act had been extended to Ireland, which meant that anyone wanting to hold office needed to show proof they had taken communion in the Anglican Church of Ireland. This excluded Catholics, Presbyterians, and other non-Anglican Protestants. Presbyterian marriages weren't recognised and their children were considered illegitimate. Alongside these grievances, rising taxes, linen manufacture becoming less profitable, and a series of poor harvests in the 1710s all contributed towards rising support for emigration.

== Emigration to New England ==
In the spring of 1718, the people began to ready themselves for emigration. Around 100 families left from Coleraine and Derry bound for Boston in 1718, but they were not wholly welcomed in Massachusetts. During the winter, McGregor preached in Dracut, Massachusetts, and his group of emigrants joined the group settled at Nutfield, New Hampshire in April 1719. During that autumn, an incident occurred between newly settled men from Haverhill and a party from Nutfield, headed to cut grass. The Haverhill men, newly settled, confronted McGregor's party, attempting to deny their right to cut the grass. One of the Haverhill men, shaking his fist in McGregor's face, declared that it was only his ‘black coat’ that had saved him. McGregor threw off his coat, and declared "well it shan’t save you, Sir!". The population at Nutfield grew, and in 1722 the settlement was renamed Londonderry.

== Death and legacy ==
McGregor died on 5 March 1729 and was buried in Londonderry, New Hampshire. His son, David McGregor, became the first minister of the western parish of Derry, when the second congregation was formed. David McGregor's son, Robert McGregor, was a Colonel during the Revolutionary War and was an aide-de-camp to Gen. John Stark. In the First Parish Church at Derry, New Hampshire, there is a “MacGregor Memorial Window”; a stained-glassed window depicting the Clan MacGregor chief's coat of arms, the quote E’en do bait spair nocht, and Scottish tartan. It mentions a few people connected to the family, including Rev. James MacGregore, Rev. David MacGregore, and Col. Robert MacGregor.
