= Nugent baronets of Donore (first creation, 1768) =

Nugent Baronetcy, of Donore
- Arms of the Nugent baronets of Donore
- Creation date: 18 July 1768
- Creation: First
- Baronetage: Baronetage of Ireland
- Status: Extinct
- Extinction date: August 1799

The Nugent Baronetcy, of Donore in the County of Westmeath, was created in the Baronetage of Ireland on 18 July 1768 for James Nugent, with remainder to his younger brother Peter. On the latter's death in 1799 the title became extinct. With the Nugent baronets of Donore (second creation, 1831), however, their great-nephew Percy Nugent was created a baronet.

== Nugent baronets, of Donore (1768) ==
- Sir James Nugent, 1st Baronet (1730–1794)
- Sir Peter Nugent, 2nd Baronet (1745–1799)
