= Alexander McDonald (sculptor) =

Scottish sculptor

Alexander McDonald Sr.
- Born: 1794; Rannoch, Perthshire, Scotland
- Died: 23 March 1860 (aged 65–66); Aberdeen, Scotland
- Occupation: Sculptor

Alexander McDonald jr.
- Born: 1837
- Died: December 27, 1884 (aged 46–47); Aberdeen, Scotland
- Burial place: St Machar's Cathedral
- Occupation: Sculptor

Alexander McDonald, M'Donald or MacDonald (1794 – 23 March 1860) was a Scottish sculptor specialising in granite. He was also an expert on Egyptian granite sculpture.

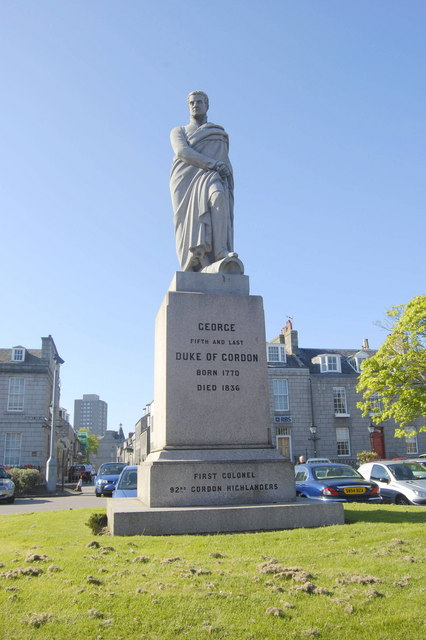
Statue of the Duke of Gordon, Golden Square Aberdeen

The firm of Alexander McDonald & Co lasted from 1820 until 1941. As a company, they were responsible for a huge number of major public monuments, graves and drinking fountains, all executed in polished granite, a technique perfected by the company. Their most noteworthy works include the fountains in Trafalgar Square and the tomb of Albert and Queen Victoria.

== Alexander McDonald Sr. ==
He was born in the parish of Rannoch in Perthshire in 1794, the son of a crofter.

He adapted the machines and equipment developed by Stewart McGlashan to enable the sculpting of granite. This had not been done since the time of the ancient Egyptians due to the extreme difficulty of working granite with any degree of accuracy. He travelled to the British Museum in London to make careful studies of the granite sculptures from ancient Egypt, removed from Luxor and Carnac. These inspired him to reinvent the lost skill of sculpting in granite.

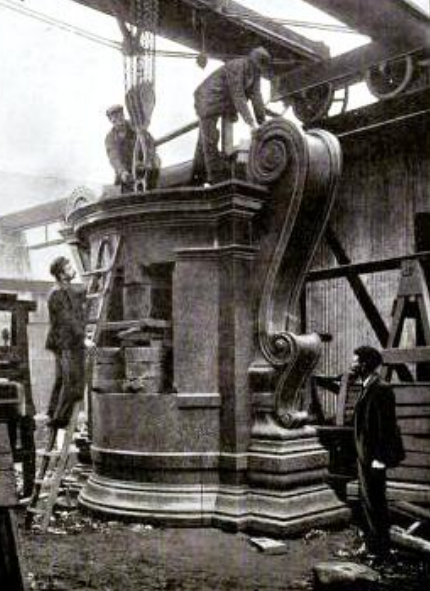
Finishing of the granite base to the monument to Charles Garnier at Alexander MacDonald's yard in Aberdeen prior to shipping to Paris

Taking machinery to Aberdeen (the main area of granite quarrying in Scotland) from 1829 onwards he developed a major (and highly profitable) business in creation of granite sculptures and headstones, of growing complexity with the passage of time. He also appears to have invested in nearby granite quarries, including Dancing Cairns Quarry in the Bucksburn district of north-west Aberdeen.

In 1838 he went into business with William Leslie of Nethermuir, a building contractor and architect (and later Lord Provost of Aberdeen) as McDonald & Leslie. In the Great Exhibition of 1851 at the Crystal Palace in London they earned several medals for the quality of their work. The business was dissolved in 1853 due to Leslie's growing interest in Aberdeen politics.

McDonald died of bronchitis on 23 March 1860 at his townhouse, 7 Bon Accord Square in Aberdeen.

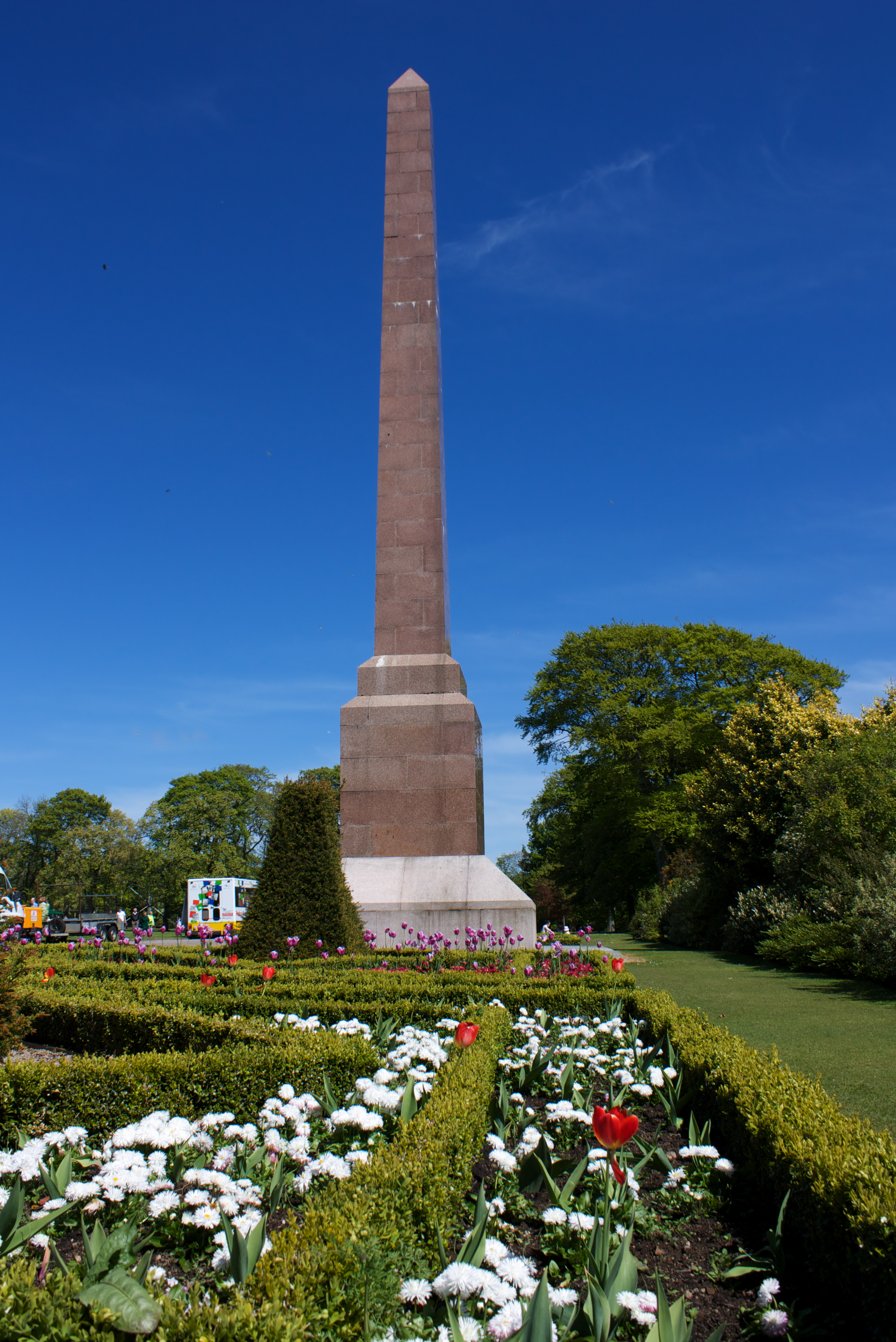
McGrigor obelisk in Duthie Park

== Alexander McDonald jr. ==
His son (1837-1884) continued the firm after his father's death. William Leslie appears to have got on better with father than son, and resigned in 1863 to go into local politics. McDonald jr. had brought Sydney Field into the firm in 1860 to increase artistry, and made him a full partner in 1863 when Leslie left, creating McDonald & Field.

In 1864 Alexander had a stroke, and used a wheelchair for the rest of his life. He continued to run the company and continued to enter international competitions winning further medals at the Paris Exhibition of 1867, the Philadelphia Exposition of 1876 and Melbourne International Exhibition (1880).

In 1867 they received a hugely important commission from Queen Victoria to create a Cairngall granite sarcophagus for Prince Albert to be placed in Frogmore, with the effigies on the upper slab being designed by Carlo Marochetti. Following this the firm declared themselves as "granite sculptors to the Queen".

He made a trip to Rome in 1869 to make studies of sculpture.

Around 1870 he commissioned Kepplestone House in Aberdeen and was thereafter referred to as Alexander McDonald of Kepplestone.

He died on 27 December 1884 and is buried in a huge pink granite sarcophagus of his own design in the churchyard of St Machar's Cathedral.

On his death he bequeathed 150 paintings to Aberdeen Art Gallery and Museum, including works by Joseph Edgar Boehm, George Anderson Lawson, G F Watts, Sir Joseph Noel Paton, G D Leslie, Sir Frederick Leighton, William MacTaggart and Edward Poynter.

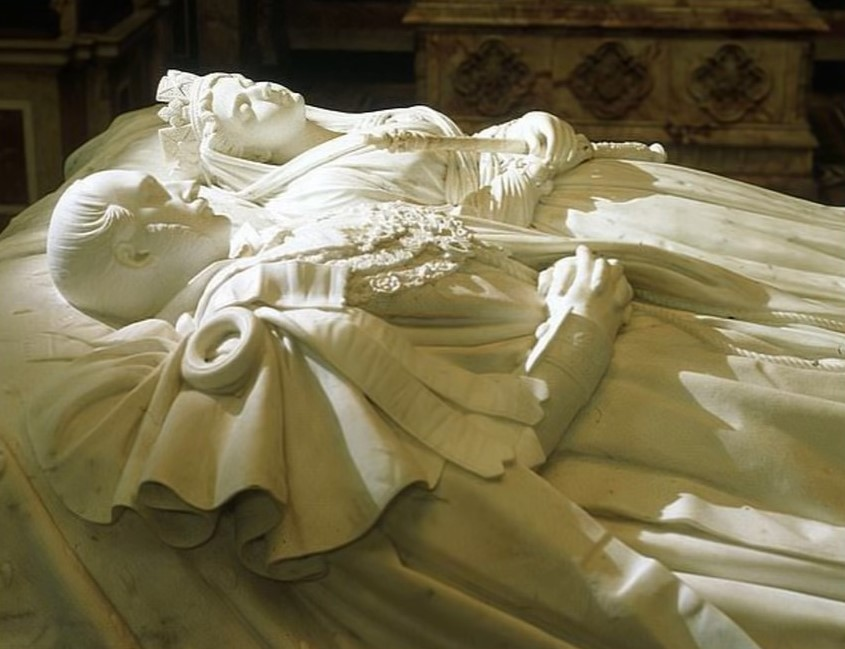
Tomb of Queen Victoria and Prince Albert

== Continuing work ==
On McDonald jr's death, Sydney Field also decided to quit, and sold his share in the company to Robert Ferguson late in 1884. Ferguson kept his name out of the firm's name and renamed it simply MacDonald & Co also creating a sister company the Aberdeen Granite Works.

By the end of the 19th century the company had also opened two premises in Glasgow (Byers Road and Robertson Street) plus a premises in London (369-375 Euston Road).

The company received a group of commissions for South Africa, linked to the Boer War.

McDonald & Co and the Aberdeen Granite Works were wound up in 1941.

== Works ==
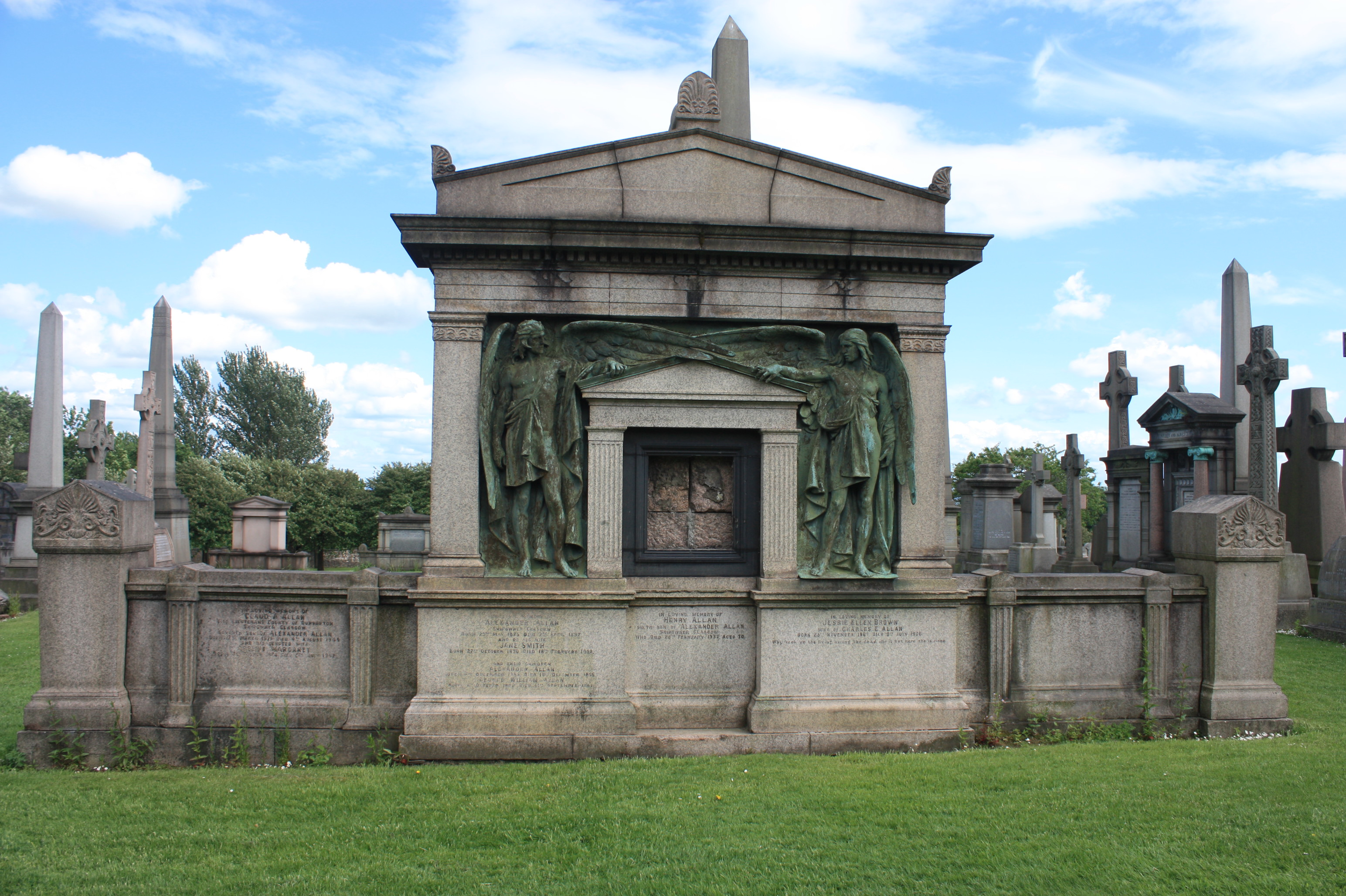
The grave of Alexander and Hugh Allan, shipbuilders, Glasgow Necropolis

- Corinthian columns on front of St George's Hall, Liverpool (1841-1850) for C R Cockerell
- Fountains in Trafalgar Square (1845)
- Monument to James Jeffrey (1848) Glasgow Necropolis
- Statue of the 5th Duke of Gordon (1848) originally in Castlegate, Aberdeen, relocated to Golden Square in 1952
- Huge obelisk to James McGrigor (1851) originally at Marischal College relocated to Duthie Park in 1890
- Monument to Robert Baird of Auchmedden (1856) Glasgow Necropolis
- Monument to Robert Barclay, shipbuilder (1864) Glasgow Necropolis designed by John Thomas Rochead
- Monument to Anne Stephen (1867) Glasgow Necropolis
- Monument to Elizabeth Burges (1867) Glasgow Necropolis working with Galbraith & Winton
- Tomb of Queen Victoria and Prince Albert at Frogmore (1867)
- Grave of William Darling (1868) Glasgow Necropolis
- pedestal for statue of John Elder (1869) in Elder Park (for Joseph Edgar Boehm)
- Monument to Lt Col Charles Seton Guthrie (1875) in Kensal Green Cemetery
- Memorial to 74th Highlanders (1883) in Glasgow Cathedral
- Mausoleum to 2nd Earl of Kilmorey (1881) in Brompton Cemetery
- Mausoleum to Lt General Duncan Sim (1888) in Kensal Green Cemetery
- Huge Allan monument in Glasgow Necropolis (1894-1899) working with James Pittendrigh Macgillivray who did the bronze figures
- Monument to Robert Cochran, Provost of Paisley (1898) in Hawkhead Cemetery in Paisley (portrait panel stolen)
- Monument to Charles Garnier in Paris (1899)
- Grave of Prince Christian Victor of Schleswig-Holstein in Pretoria, South Africa (1901)
- Monument to General Edward Woodgate at Spion Kop in South Africa (1901)
- Monument to William Dick-Cunyngham VC at Ladysmith, South Africa (1901)
- Memorial to Alfred, Duke of Saxe-Coburg and Gotha, second son of Queen Victoria (1901) at Balmoral Castle
- Monument to James Wilson (1907) in Hampstead Cemetery
- Granite work on Ashburnham Library in Cambridge

== Drinking fountains ==
From around 1880 they began to specialise in drinking fountains. Notable examples include:

- James Crum Memorial Fountain (1861) George Square, Glasgow
- Martyrs Memorial Fountain (1864) relocated from Castle Street to St Mungo Avenue in 1984
- Richard Vaughn Yates Memorial Fountain (1858) in Liverpool (vandalised)

== Artistic recognition ==
A bust of McDonald jr by William Brodie is held by the Aberdeen Art Gallery and Museum.

=== Gallery ===
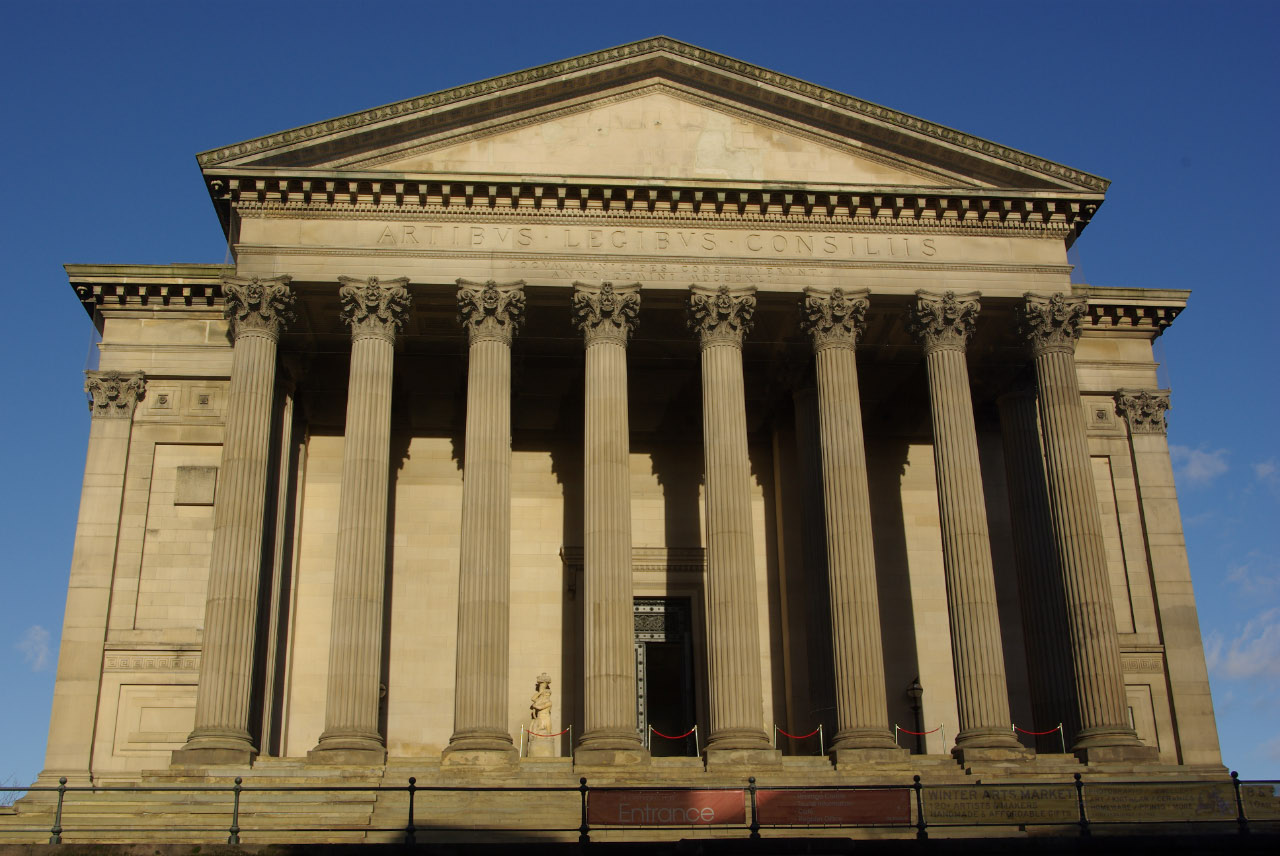
Columns on St George's Hall, Liverpool

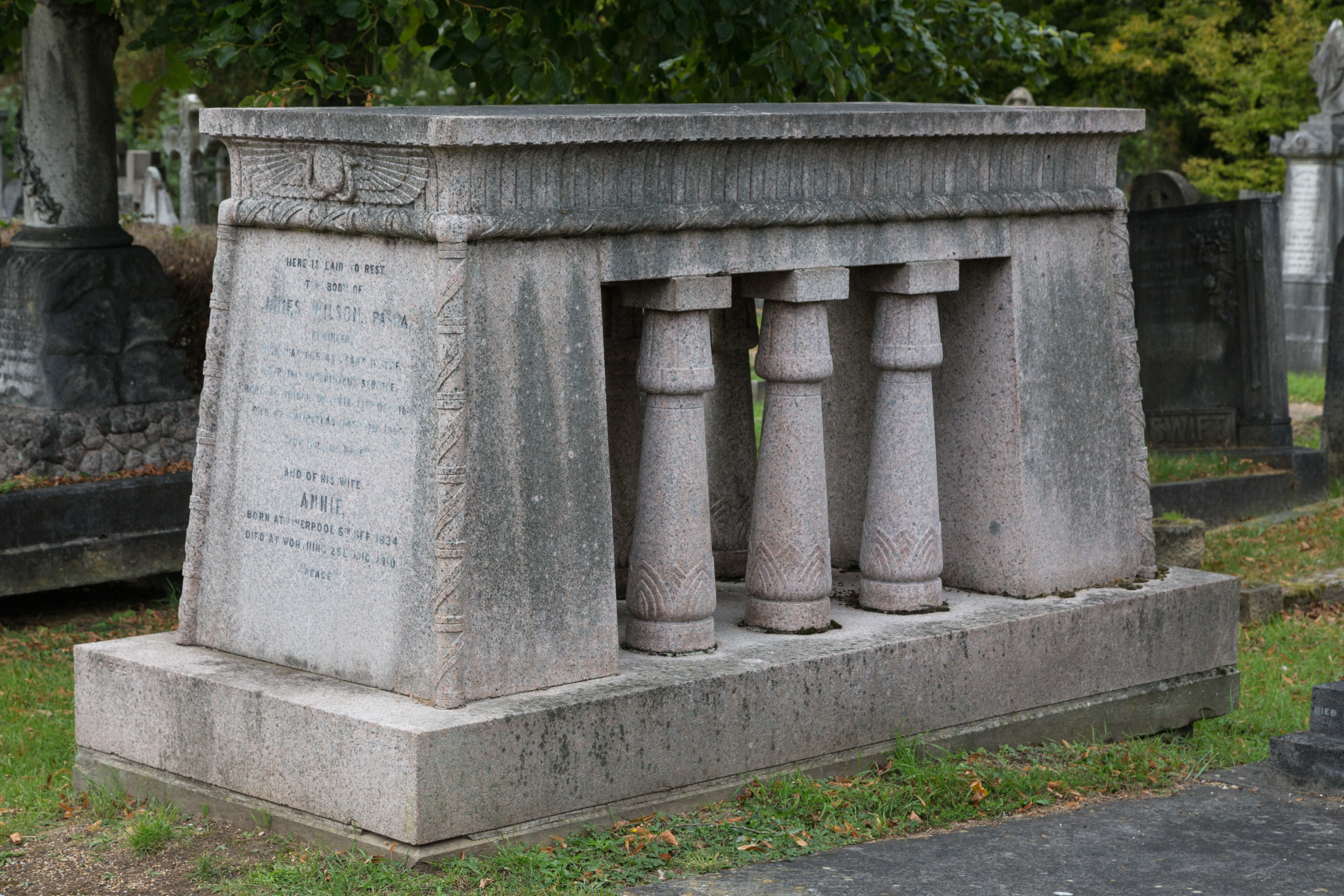
Tomb of James Wilson in Hampstead Cemetery

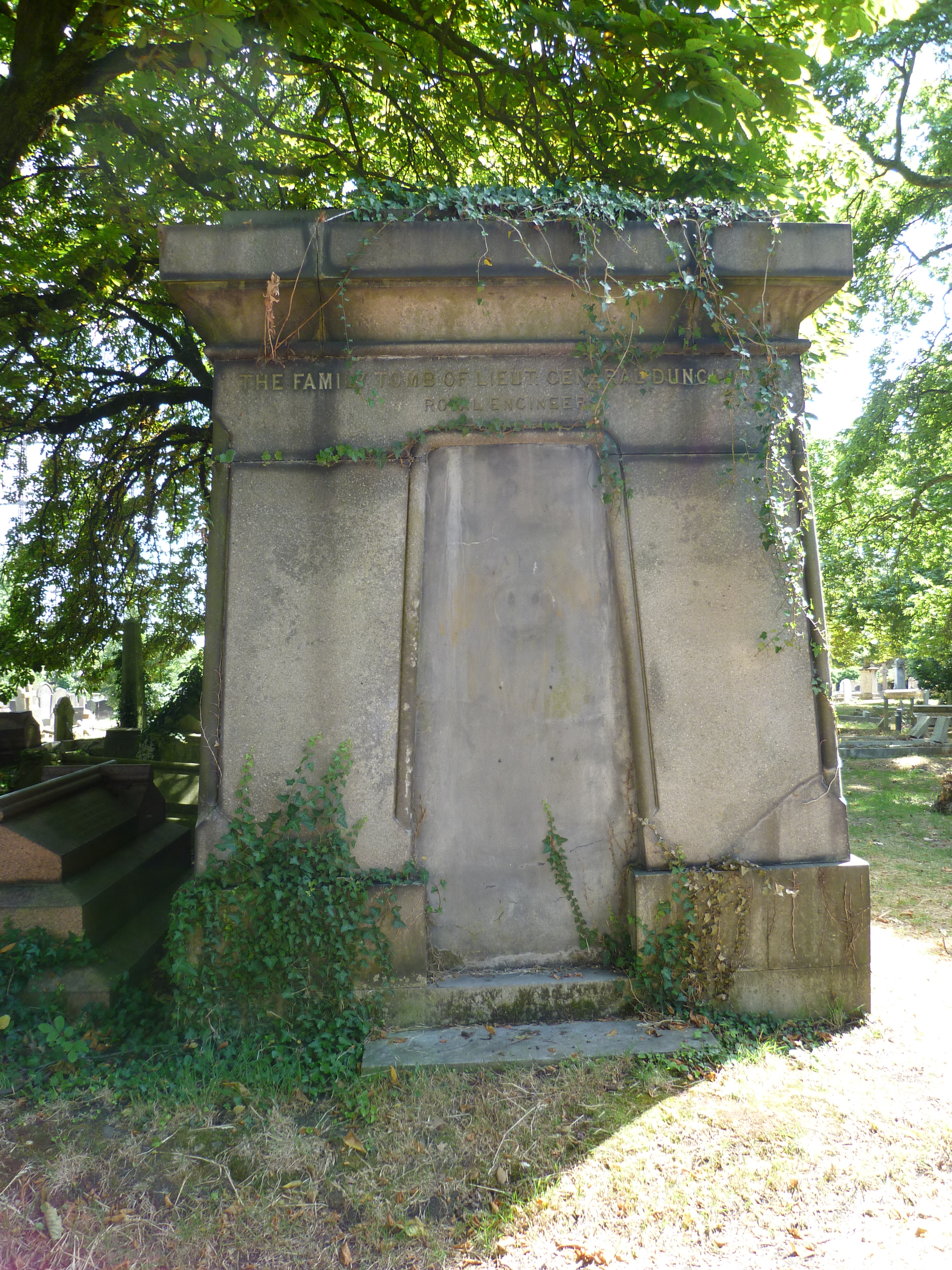
Lt. general Duncan Sim mausoleum in Kensal Green Cemetery

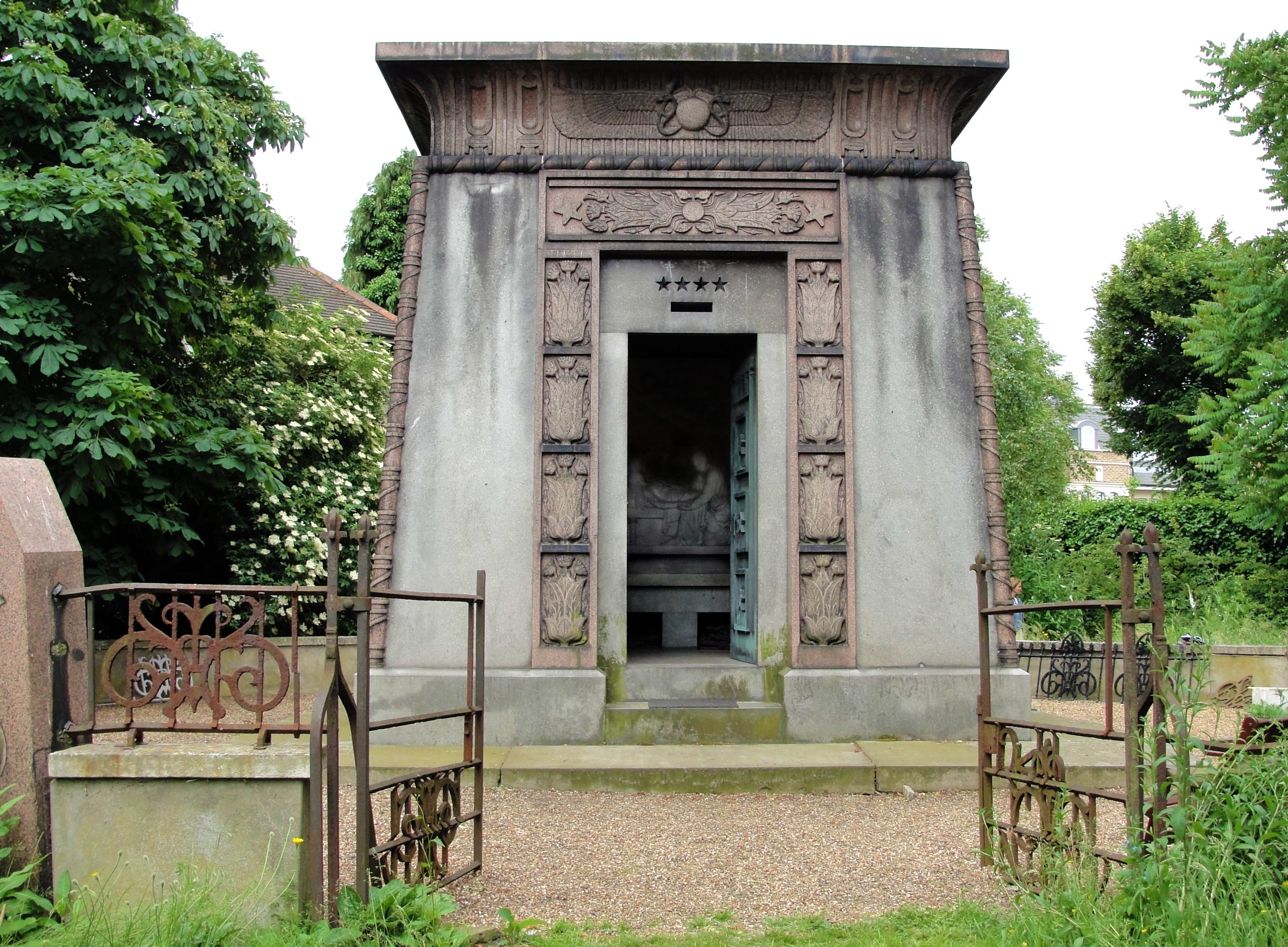
Mausoleum to 2nd Earl of Kilmorey in Brompton Cemetery

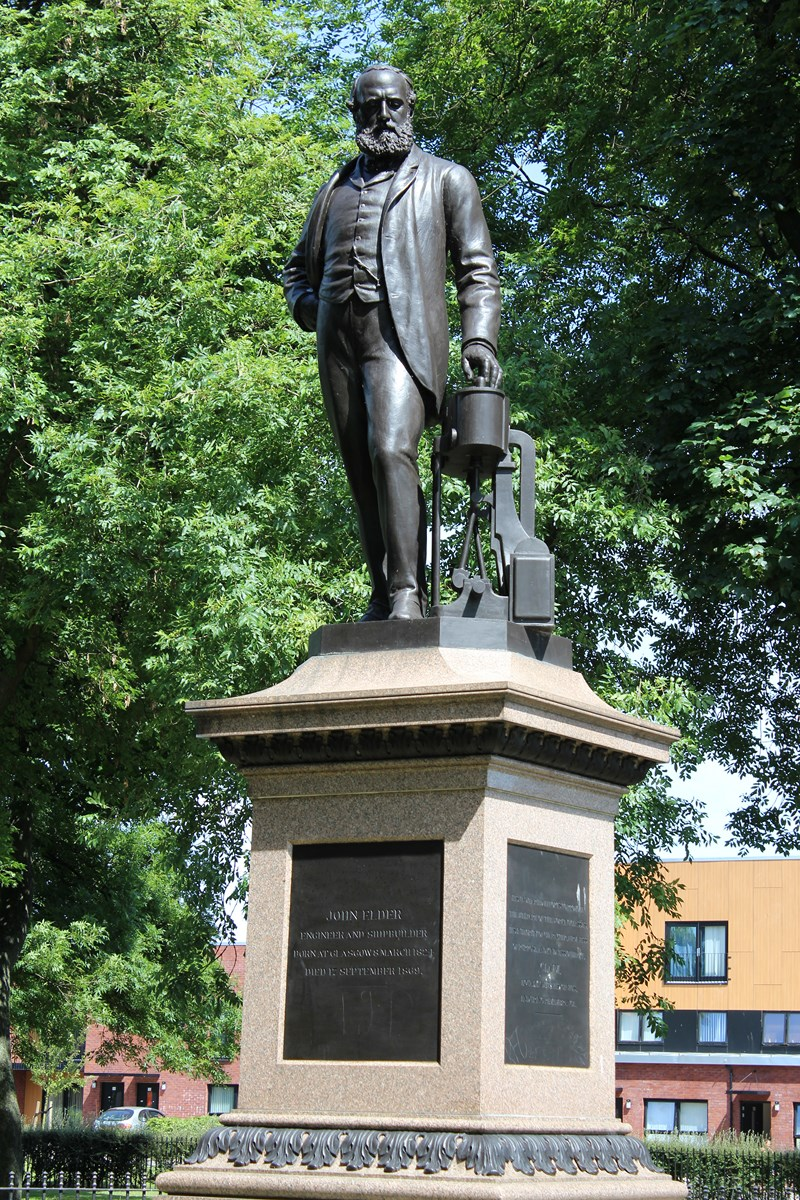
Statue of John Elder, Elder Park, Glasgow

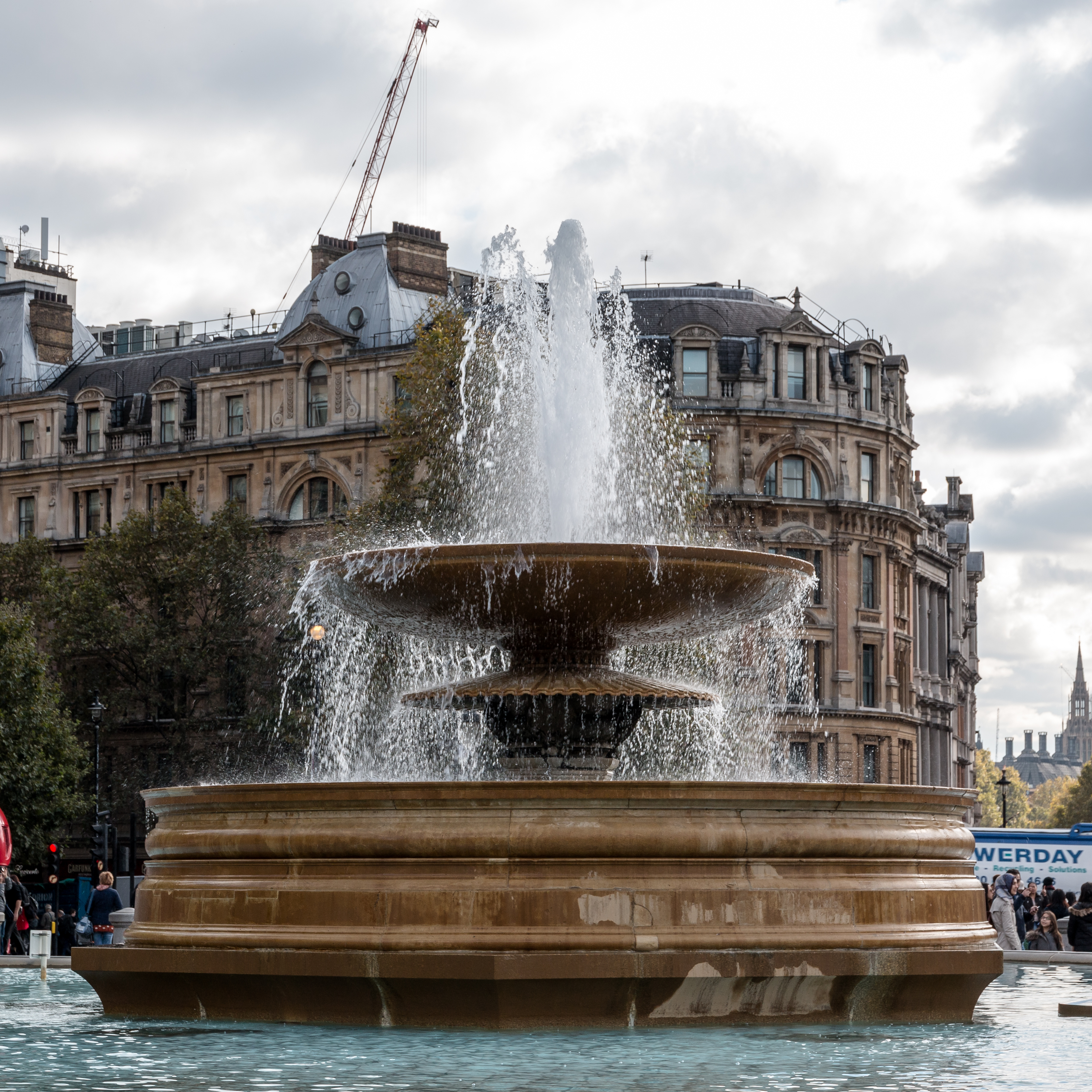
Fountain in Trafalgar Square

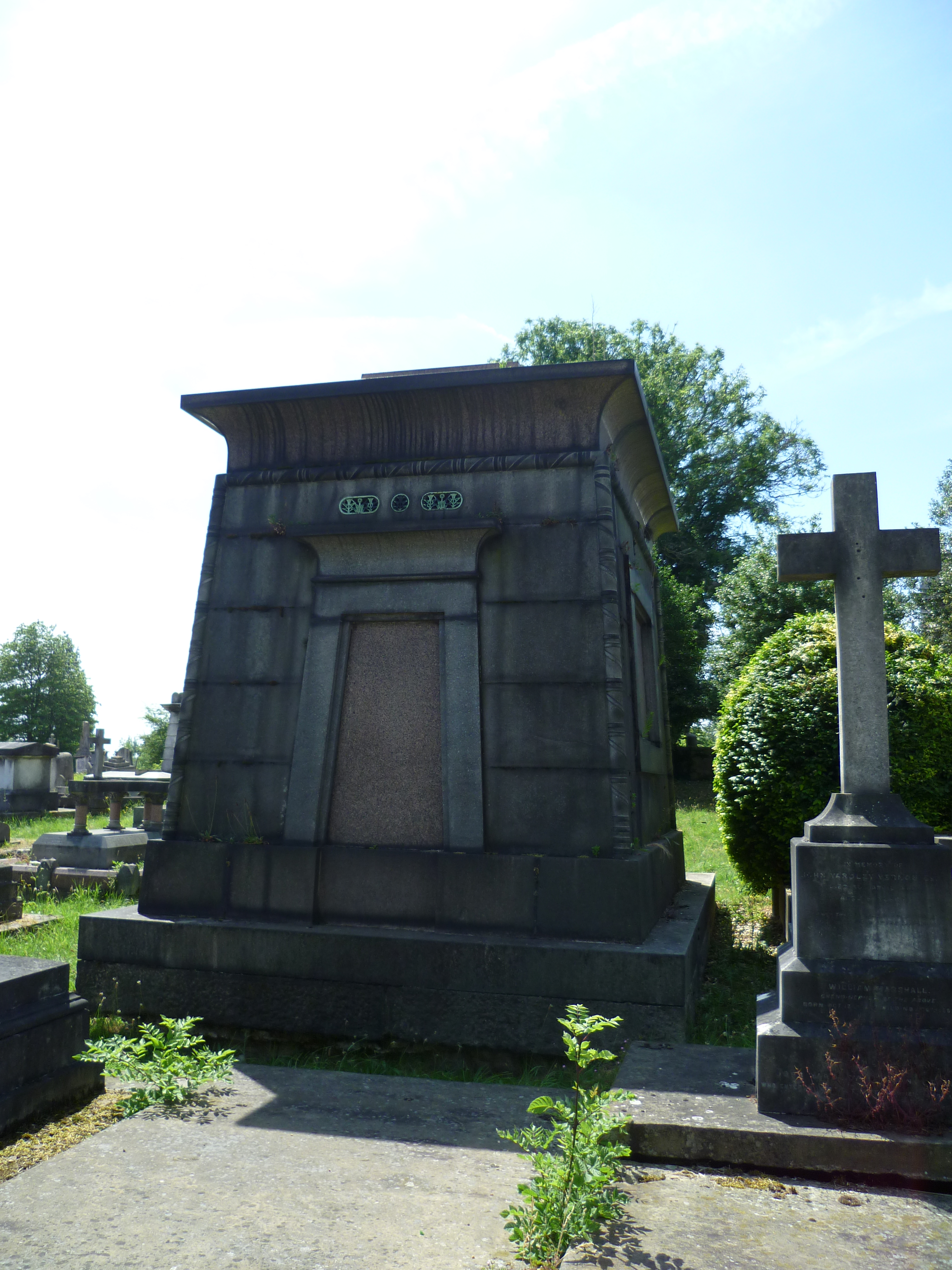
General Sim's mausoleum in Kensal Green Cemetery

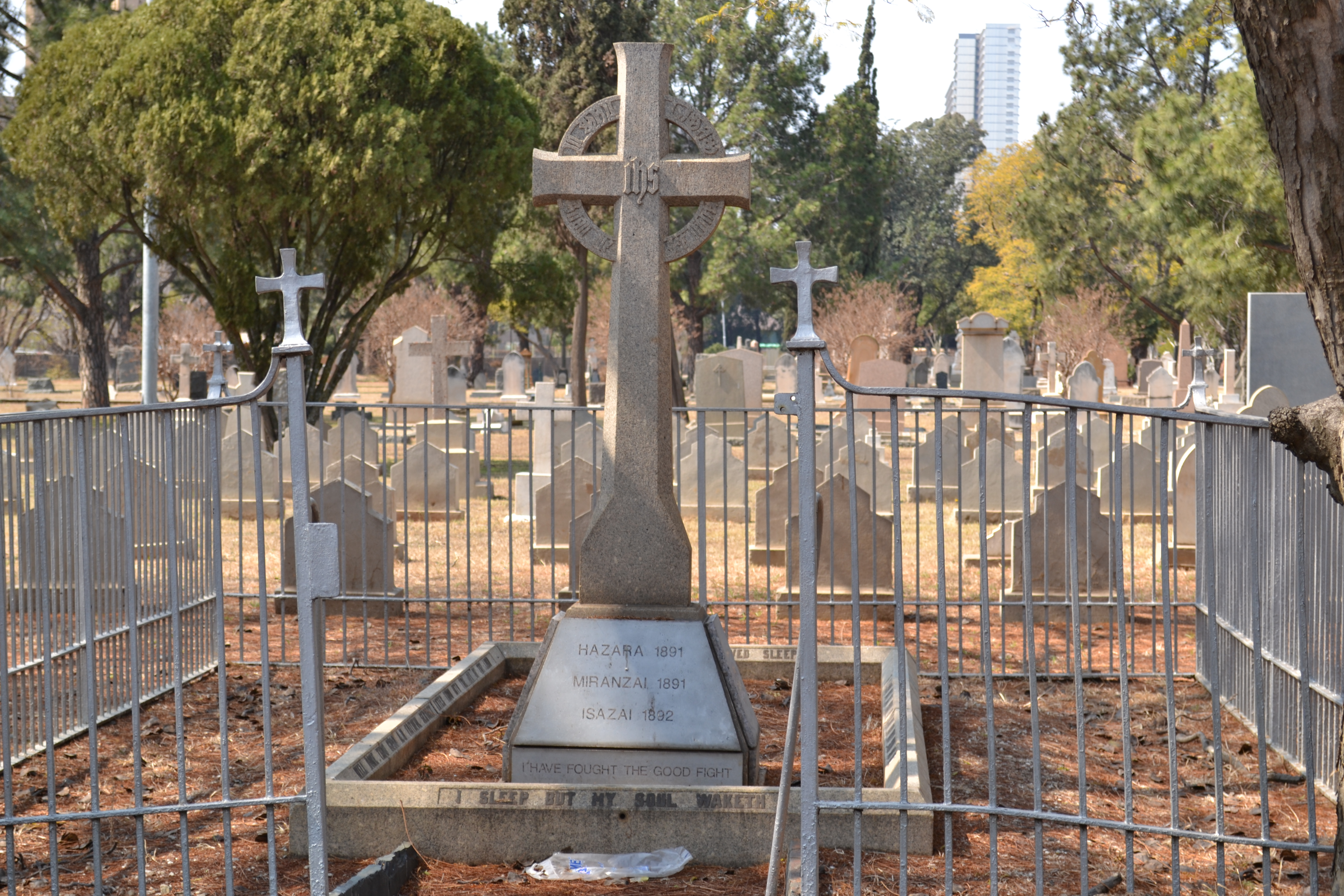
Grave of Prince Christian Victor in Pretoria

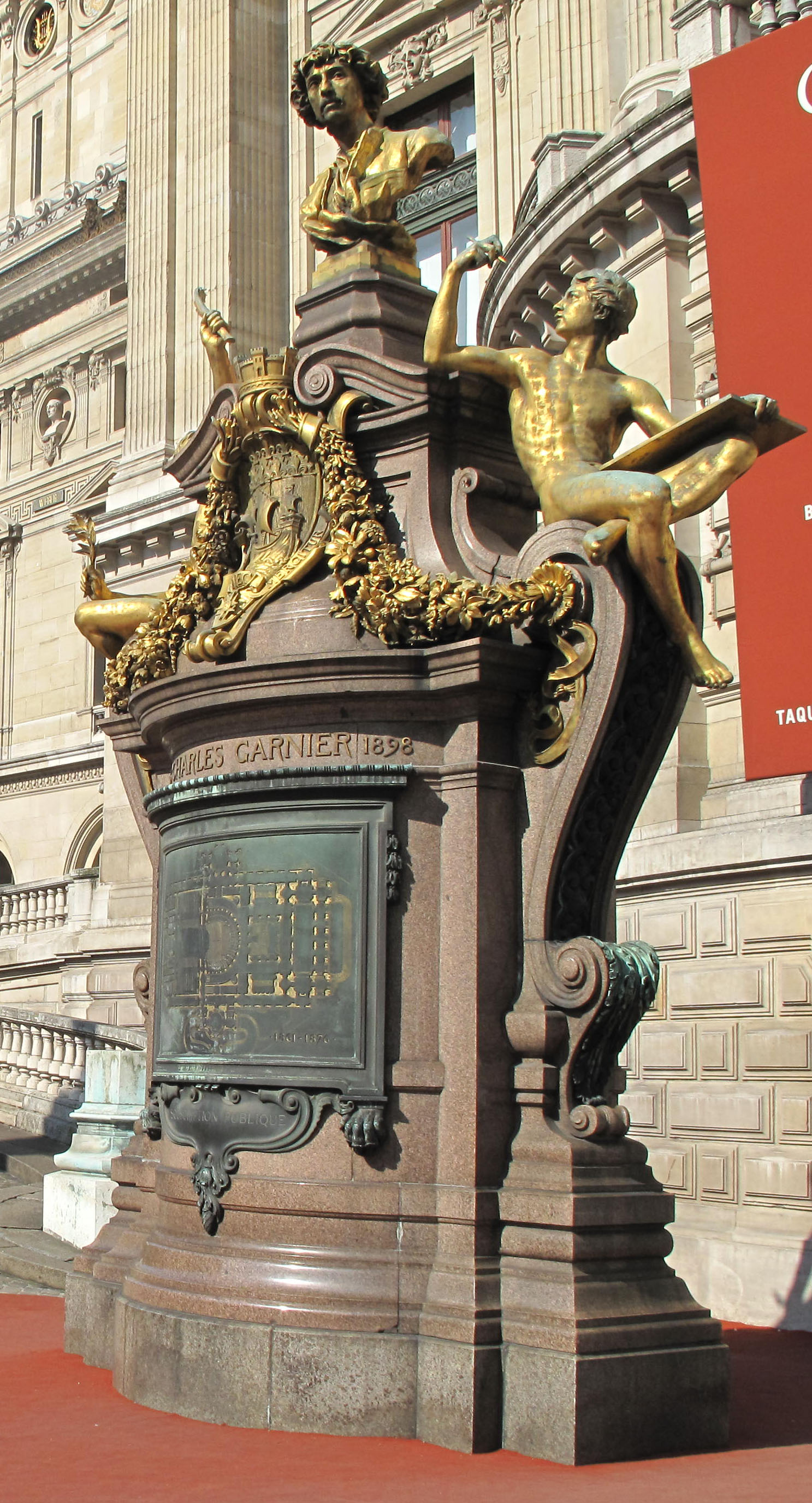
Monument to Charles Garnier at the Palais Garnier
