= McKenny baronets =

Extinct baronetcy in the Baronetage of the United Kingdom

Escutcheon of the McKenny baronets

The McKenny Baronetcy was a title in the Baronetage of the United Kingdom. It was created in September 1831 for Thomas McKenny, Lord Mayor of Dublin in 1819.

The title became extinct on the death of the second Baronet on 10 November 1866 at Tremezzo, Lake Como, Italy.

== McKenny baronets (1831) ==
- Sir Thomas McKenny, 1st Baronet (1770–1849)
- Sir William McKenny, 2nd Baronet (1798–1866)

Baronetage of the United Kingdom
Preceded by McGrigor baronets	McKenny baronets of Ullard and Montrathe; 30 September 1831	Succeeded by Meux baronets
