= Sir James McGrigor, 1st Baronet =

Scottish physician, military surgeon and botanist

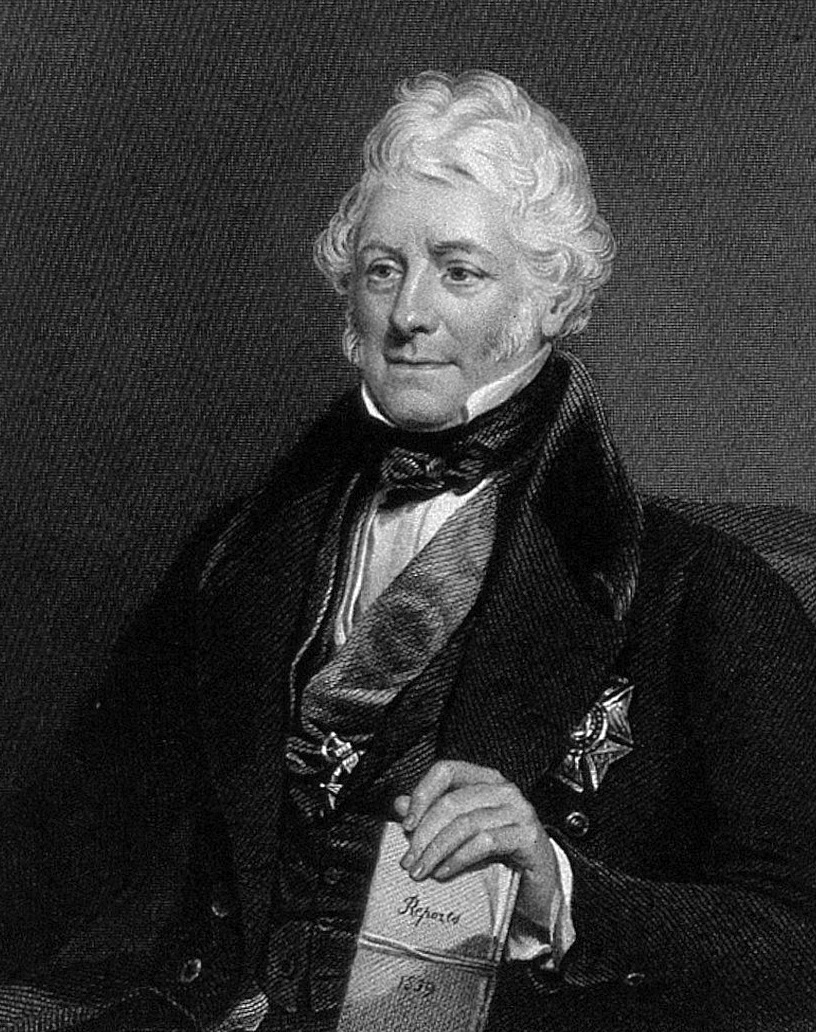
James McGrigor c. 1839

Sir James McGrigor, 1st Baronet, KCB, FRS, FRSE, FRCPE (9 April 1771 – 2 April 1858) was a Scottish physician, military surgeon and botanist, considered to be the man largely responsible for the creation of the Royal Army Medical Corps. He served as Rector of the University of Aberdeen.

== Early life ==
McGrigor was the son of Colquhoun McGrigor, a clothing merchant from Aberdeen, and his wife Anne Grant. McGrigor was born in Cromdale, Inverness-shire, and educated at Aberdeen Grammar School for five years, and graduated from the University of Aberdeen in 1788. He received medical training at the University of Edinburgh beginning in September 1789.

== Army surgeon ==
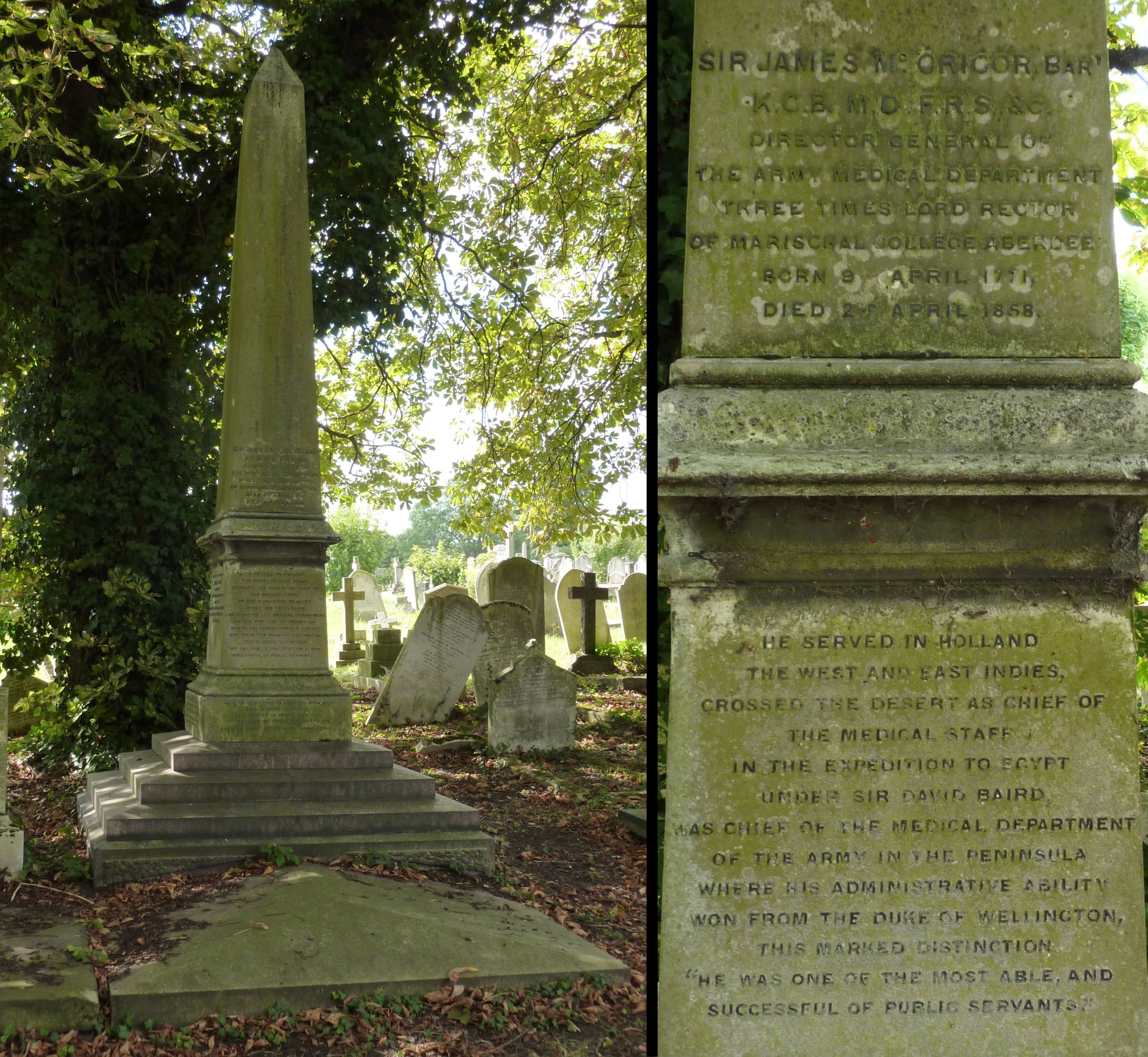
McGrigor's funerary monument at Kensal Green Cemetery, London, photographed in 2014

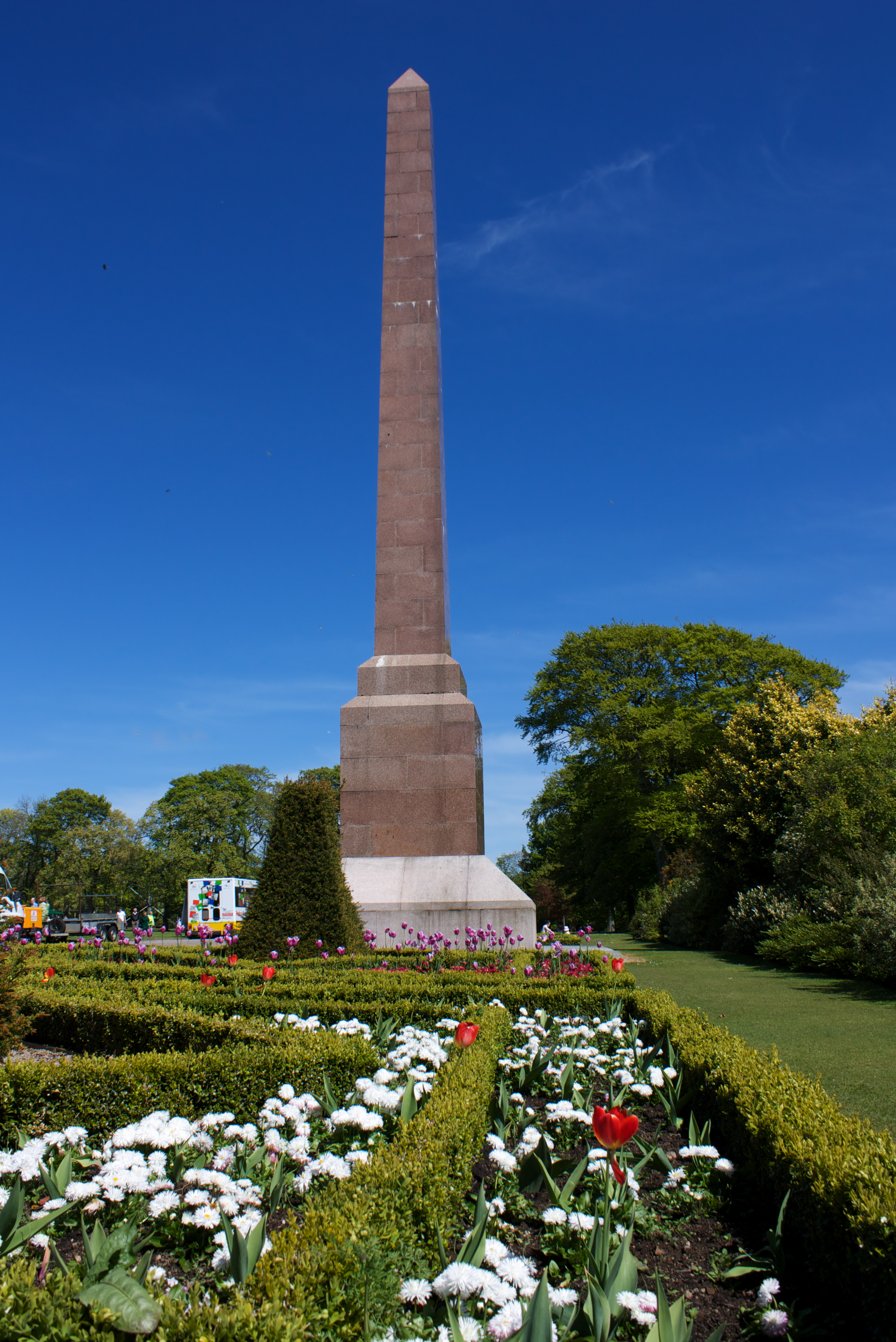
Monument to Sir James McGrigor in Duthie Park, Aberdeen

=== Spain and Portugal ===
In 1811, he was appointed Surgeon-General for the Duke of Wellington's army in Spain and Portugal during the Peninsular Wars (1808–14).

=== Director-General ===
McGrigor returned to Britain before the Battle of Waterloo, and was knighted (1814). He went on to serve as Director-General of the Army Medical Service (1815–51) and did much to reform that department. (He was succeeded in that post by Andrew Smith, who had at one time been McGrigor's Special Assistant since 1830.)

In 1821 McGrigor was elected the first President of the Medico-Botanical Society of London, established by Dr John Frost to catalogue medicinal plants. He served this role until 1828 when he was succeeded by Earl Stanhope.

McGrigor introduced the stethoscope in 1821, set up field hospitals for those injured in action, and generally improved the standards of cleanliness and hygiene. Sir James was created a Baronet on 30 September 1831, and was appointed a Knight Companion of the Order of the Bath (KCB) in 1850.

== Legacy ==
McGrigor's autobiography was published in 1861. An obelisk to his memory has been placed in Aberdeen and is now in Duthie Park. A statue of McGrigor was erected at Chelsea Hospital on 18 November 1865, paid for by public subscription. The sculptor, Matthew Nobel (1817–1876), was a leading British portrait sculptor. In 1909 the statue was moved to a small courtyard on Atterbury Street, Westminster. The statue was moved again in 2002 to its current location at the Royal Military Academy Sandhurst.

McGrigor Barracks, built in the 1890s opposite the Cambridge Military Hospital in Aldershot in Hampshire, were named after him.

== Recognition ==
A huge granite obelisk by Alexander McDonald & Co was initially erected at Marischal College in Aberdeen to McGrigor's memory in 1851. It was relocated to Duthie Park in 1890.

Baronetage of the United Kingdom
| New creation | Baronet (of Campden Hill); 1831–1858 | Succeeded by James Rhoderic Duff McGrigor |
