= Humble baronets of Cloncoskoran (1831) =

Extinct baronetcy

Escutcheon of the Humble baronets of Cloncoskoran

The Humble, later Nugent baronetcy, of Cloncoskoran in the County of Waterford, was created in the Baronetage of the United Kingdom on 30 September 1831 for John Nugent Humble. The third Baronet used the surname of Nugent only. On his death in 1929, the title became extinct.

== Humble, later Nugent Baronets, of Cloncoskoran (1831) ==
- Sir John Nugent Humble, 1st Baronet (1785–1834)
- Sir John Nugent Humble, 2nd Baronet (1818–1886)
- Sir John Nugent Nugent, 3rd Baronet (1849–1929).

== Notes ==
Baronetage of the United Kingdom
Preceded by Meux baronets of Theobald's Park (1831)	Humble baronets of Cloncoskoran; 30 September 1831	Succeeded by Nugent baronets
