= Mackintosh baronets =

Set index for Mackintosh baronets

There have been two baronetcies created for people with the surname Mackintosh, both in the Baronetage of the United Kingdom. One creation is extant as of 2010.

- Mackintosh baronets of Mackintosh (1812)
- Mackintosh baronets of Halifax (1935): see Viscount Mackintosh of Halifax
