= Robert Bree =

English physician

Robert Bree, MD (1759–1839) was an English physician.

== Biography ==
Bree was born at Solihull, Warwickshire, in 1759. He was educated at Coventry and at University College, Oxford, where he graduated on 6 April 1775, and took his B.A. degree on 10 November 1778, and, having studied medicine at Edinburgh, proceeded M.A. on 10 July 1781. He was admitted, 31 July 1781, an extra-licentiate of the College of Physicians; took his bachelor's degree in medicine on 4 July 1782, and that of M.D. on 12 July 1791. He had first settled at Northampton, and was appointed physician to the general infirmary in that town, which after a short stay he left for Leicester, to the infirmary of which he became physician. An obstinate attack of asthma caused in 1793 a temporary retirement from his profession. In 1794, he accepted the command of a company in a regiment of militia, and in 1796 settled at Birmingham, where he was appointed in March 1801 physician to the General Hospital.

Bree was consulted for asthma by the Duke of Sussex, by whose advice Bree removed in 1804 to Hanover Square, London. He was admitted a candidate of the Royal College of Physicians on 31 March 1806, and a fellow on 23 March of the following year. He was censor in the years 1810, 1819, and 1830, and on 2 July in the last-mentioned year was named an elect. In 1827, Bree was chosen Harveian lecturer, and published the lecture course he delivered. In 1808, he was elected a Fellow of the Royal Society.

Bree withdrew from practice in 1833, and, after suffering from renewed asthma, died in Park Square West, Regent's Park, on 6 October 1839.

== Publications ==
Bree published A Practical Inquiry into Disordered Respiration, distinguishing the Species of Convulsive Asthma, their Causes, and Indications of Cure, London, 1797. It reached a fifth edition in 1815, and was translated into several languages. "In this work," says Dr. Munk, the author "embodied the numerous experiments in his own case, gave a more full and complete view of asthma and dyspnœa than had hitherto appeared, and laid down some important therapeutic rules, the practical value of which has been universally acknowledged."

Bree contributed two papers "On the Use of Digitalis in Consumption" to the Medical and Physical Journal, 1799. He was also the author of a paper "On Painful Affections of the Side from Tumid Spleen", read 1 January 1811 before the Medical and Chirurgical Society, of which Bree became a member of council and a vice-president in March following; and of a second paper on the same subject, read 26 May 1812, "A Case of Splenitis, with further Remarks on that Disease". These papers were later published in the first and second volumes of the Medico-Chirurgical Transactions. Bree was further the author of a short tract, Thoughts on Cholera Asphyxia (London, 1832).
