= Viscount Mackintosh of Halifax =

Viscountcy in the Peerage of the United Kingdom

Viscount Mackintosh of Halifax, of Hethersett in the County of Norfolk, is a title in the Peerage of the United Kingdom. It was created on 10 July 1957 for the businessman and public servant Harold Mackintosh, 1st Baron Mackintosh of Halifax. He was the owner of the confectionery business of John Mackintosh & Sons Ltd and for many years Chairman of the National Savings Committee. Mackintosh had already been created a baronet, of Halifax in the West Riding of the County of York, in the Baronetage of the United Kingdom on 28 January 1935, and Baron Mackintosh of Halifax, of Hethersett in the County of Norfolk, on 6 February 1948, also in the Peerage of the United Kingdom. As of 2023 the titles are held by his grandson, the third Viscount, who succeeded his father in 1980.

== Mackintosh baronets, of Halifax (1935) ==
- Harold Vincent Mackintosh, 1st Baronet (1891–1964) (created Baron Mackintosh of Halifax in 1948)

=== Baron Mackintosh of Halifax (1948) ===
- Harold Vincent Mackintosh, 1st Baron Mackintosh of Halifax (1891–1964) (created Viscount Mackintosh of Halifax in 1957)

=== Viscount Mackintosh of Halifax (1957) ===
- Harold Vincent Mackintosh, 1st Viscount Mackintosh of Halifax (1891–1964)
- John Mackintosh, 2nd Viscount Mackintosh of Halifax (1921–1980)
- John Clive Mackintosh, 3rd Viscount Mackintosh of Halifax (b. 1958)

The heir apparent is the present holder's son, the Hon. Thomas Harold George Mackintosh (b. 1985).
The heir apparent's heir apparent is his son, Milo Edward Mackintosh (b. 2020).

== Coat of arms ==
Coat of arms of Viscount Mackintosh of Halifax
Crest Upon a rock Proper charged with two roses Argent barbed and seeded a cat sejant also Proper. Escutcheon Or on a chevron between two lions rampant in chief and a lymphad in base Sable a bezant charged with a representation of the head of St John the Baptist Proper between two hearts of the field. Supporters On either side a squirrel Proper about the neck a cord and pendent therefrom a purse both Or. Motto By Faith And By Work.

== Line of succession ==
- Harold Vincent Mackintosh, 1st Viscount Mackintosh of Halifax (1891–1964)
  - John Mackintosh, 2nd Viscount Mackintosh of Halifax (1921–1980)
    - (John) Clive Mackintosh, 3rd Viscount Mackintosh of Halifax (b. 1958)
      - (1) Hon. Thomas Harold George Mackintosh (b. 1985)
        - (2) Milo Edward Mackintosh (b. 2020)
      - (3) Hon. George John Frank Mackintosh (b. 1988)
    - (4) Hon. Graham Charles Mackintosh (b. 1964)
      - (5) Matthew Joseph Mackintosh (b. 1997)
      - (6) John Ashford Mackintosh (b. 2000)
      - (7) Robert Charles Mackintosh (b. 2004)
