= Meux baronets of Kingston (1641) =

Escutcheon of the Meux baronets of Kingston

The Meux Baronetcy, of Kingston on the Isle of Wight, was created in the Baronetage of England on 11 December 1641 for John Meux, member of parliament for Newtown. He was the son of William Meux, MP for Newtown in 1604, and his wife Winifred, daughter of Francis Barrington.

The title became extinct on the death of the 3rd Baronet in 1706.

== Meux baronets, of Kingston (1641) ==
- Sir John Meux, 1st Baronet (died 1657)
- Sir William Meux, 2nd Baronet (c. 1697)
- Sir William Meux, 3rd Baronet (1683–1706)
