= McGrigor baronets =

Baronetcy in the Baronetage of the United Kingdom

The McGrigor Baronetcy, of Campden Hill in the County of Middlesex, is a title in the Baronetage of the United Kingdom. It was created on 30 September 1831 for James McGrigor. He was a military surgeon and for many years Director-General of the Army Medical Department. Charles Rhoderick McGrigor (1860–1927), second son of the second Baronet, was a Major-General in the Army and the father of Admiral of the Fleet Sir Rhoderick McGrigor. The sixth Baronet was a Conservative politician.

== McGrigor baronets, of Campden Hill (1831) ==
- Sir James McGrigor, 1st Baronet (1771–1858)
- Sir Charles Rhoderic McGrigor, 2nd Baronet (1811–1890)
- Sir James Rhoderic Duff McGrigor, 3rd Baronet (1857–1924)
- Sir Charles Colquhoun McGrigor, 4th Baronet (1893–1946)
- Sir Charles Edward McGrigor, 5th Baronet (1922–2007), married 1948 the author Mary Bettine Edmonstone, daughter of Sir Archibald Charles Edmonstone of Duntreath, 6th Baronet.
- Sir James Angus Rhoderick McGrigor, 6th Baronet (1949–2025)
- Sir Alexander James Edward Lyon McGrigor, 7th Baronet (born 1998)

The heir presumptive is the present holder's uncle Charles Edward McGrigor (born 1959).

== Notes ==
Baronetage of the United Kingdom
Preceded by Lloyd baronets	McGrigor baronets of Campden Hill; 30 September 1831	Succeeded by McKenny baronets
