= Daniel Heese =

South African missionary (1867–1901)

Rev. Carl August Daniel Heese
- Born: 24 February 1867; Amalienstein, Cape Colony
- Died: 23 August 1901 (aged 34); Northern Transvaal, South Africa
- Occupation: Missionary
- Spouse: Johanna Grützner (1893–1901; his death)
- Children: 5

Carl August Daniel Heese (24 February 1867 – 23 August 1901) was a South African missionary murdered during the Second Boer War. Although two officers of the Bushveldt Carbineers (BVC) were tried in connection with the murder and acquitted, there is evidence that one of these – Lieutenant Peter Handcock – afterwards confessed to the killing.

== Life ==
Heese was born on 24 February 1867 on the Amalienstein mission station near Ladismith in the then Cape Colony, to Daniel Heese (1833–1905) and Emma Heese (1837–1910). Heese's parents were German Lutheran missionaries who came to South Africa in 1859.

In 1868, his father founded the Berlin Lutheran congregation in Riversdale, Cape Colony. In 1880 Daniel Heese (senior) travelled to Germany with his sons Hans and Daniel; Daniel (junior) remained behind in Berlin, where he completed his schooling and trained as a missionary. On completion of his theological studies, he went to the Northern Transvaal and was ordained as a missionary of the Berlin Missionary Society. He continued in this role after the outbreak of the South African War in October 1899.

== Death ==
In the week before his death, Heese escorted a sick friend, Mr. Craig, to the Swiss Mission Hospital at Elim, north of Fort Edward, for an operation. Mr. Craig was admitted on Tuesday 20 August 1901.

Rev. Heese was in a hurry to get back to the mission station at Makaanspoort as his fourth daughter was to celebrate her first birthday on 26 August 1901. At the Swiss Mission Hospital, Rev. Heese spoke to Boer prisoners of war, some of whom he knew, including Mr. Vahmeyer, a teacher at Potgietersrust. They stated that they were afraid that they would be shot. Later when Rev. Heese was leaving, he saw that the Boer prisoners had been shot. He told Captain Alfred Taylor that he would report this to a British officer at Pietersburg. Rev. Heese and a young African boy named Silas proceeded by horse-buggy with a white flag attached, but both were shot dead before they reached Makaanspoort. Heese was then thirty-four years old.

Lieutenant Peter Handcock went on trial for Heese's murder, with Lieutenant 'Breaker' Morant for having incited the crime. Both men were acquitted of involvement in Heese's death, but were convicted on other counts of murder, and executed in 1902. In 1929, fellow BVC officer George Witton wrote to James Thomas stating that Handcock, just after his acquittal, had confessed the murder of Heese to Witton.

== Personal life ==
In 1893, Rev. Heese married Johanna Grützner, the German-born daughter of a fellow missionary from the Orange Free State. The couple was stationed at Makaanspoort near Pietersburg in the Northern Transvaal. Their first child, Martha, born 1894, died of diphtheria. Two more girls, Dorothea was born in 1896, Marie in 1897, and a fourth, Hilda, was less than one year old when their father was murdered. Their only son, also named Daniel, was born on 11 December 1901 – a few months after his death.

== Relation to books ==
Kit Denton, in his book The Breaker, spelt the surname of Heese incorrectly as 'Hesse'. In his 1983 book, Closed File Denton corrected many inaccuracies in his earlier book, including the incorrect spelling.

In the film Breaker Morant he is played by Bruno Knez.
