= Kenneth G. Ross =

Australian playwright and screenwriter

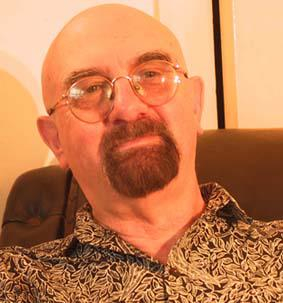
- Born: Kenneth Graham Ross; 4 June 1941 (age 85); East Brunswick, Victoria, Australia
- Occupations: Playwright, screenwriter, lyricist
- Writing career
- Period: 1977 – 2002

Kenneth Graham Ross (born 4 June 1941) is an Australian playwright, screenwriter, and lyricist best known for writing the 1978 stage play Breaker Morant, that was based on the life of Australian soldier Harry "Breaker" Morant.

With the support of the South Australian Film Corporation this play was later adapted by Ross into a film of the same name in 1980.

The film was nominated for the 1980 Academy Award for the screenplay adapted from another source.

== Early life ==
=== Family ===
Kenneth Graham Ross was born on 4 June 1941 in East Brunswick, Victoria.

His great-grandparents were Hugh Ross (1807-1898), who arrived in Australia, as a free settler, at Van Diemen's Land in 1837, and Barbara Sutherland Ross (1832-1910), née McKenzie, who arrived in Australia, at Hobsons Bay, Victoria in 1851, and George Beckton (1826-1873), born in Scotland, and Elizabeth Beckton (1838-1900), née Peirson, born in Mansfield, Victoria.

His grandparents were John Hugh Ross, Adelaide Eliza Ross, Leslie Sherlock Graham, and Queenie Nora Graham.

His parents were Kenneth McKenzie Ross, (born 1902) who served with the Australian Army, attaining the rank of Captain. and Alma Nora Ross, née Graham. He has three children.

=== Education ===
Ross attended Caulfield Grammar School, in East St Kilda, Victoria, from 1951 to 1958, where one of his teachers recognised and strongly encouraged his creative writing talents.

=== Athlete ===
Ross was an Australian rules footballer and middle distance runner.

== After school ==
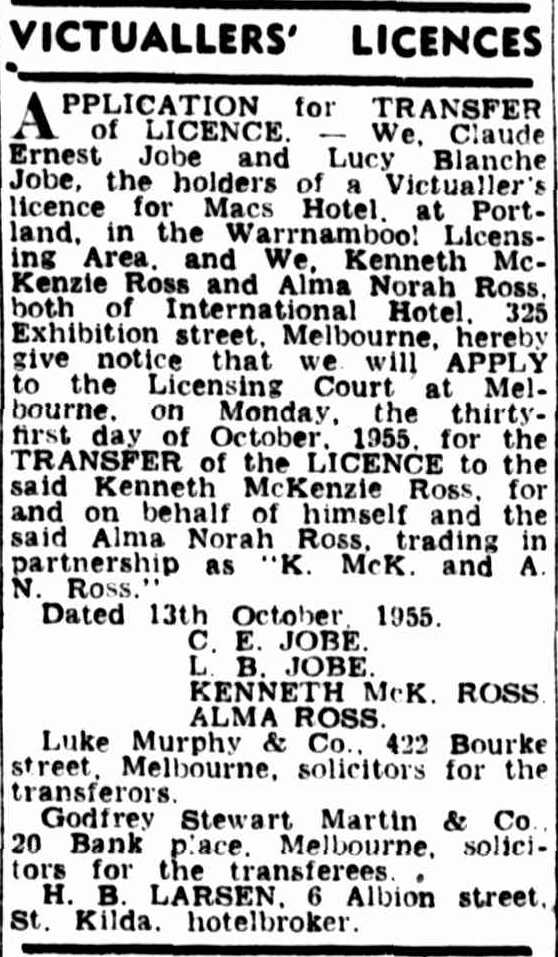
The Argus, 18 October 1955.

After several years, already convinced that he had the skill to become a creative writer, he decided that he should travel to the UK and Europe, in order to gain experience of the world and, hopefully, determine what kind of writing to which he would devote his energies.

To acquire sufficient funds to fund his explorations, he moved from Melbourne to Portland towards the end of 1961, and worked for his parents at Mac's Hotel, in Bentinck Street, Portland.

== To Europe ==
In May 1963, he left for Italy on the SS Galileo Galilei, and on that voyage, he met and was befriended by the experienced Australian professional actress, Elaine Cusick, perhaps best known at the time for her performance in The One Day of the Year. She also acted intermittently as a mentor for Ross for many years.

Once he had reached Italy, disembarking at Genoa, he set off across the continent, arriving in the UK some four months later.

== Stratford-upon-Avon ==
By chance, Ross returned from the continent to England in October 1963, and had reached Stratford-upon-Avon on his UK travels just in time to see the Royal Shakespeare Company's first performances of John Barton's three-part adaptation of Shakespeare's historical plays, now generally known as The Wars of the Roses, featuring, amongst others, Peggy Ashcroft, Roy Dotrice, Ian Holm, Brewster Mason, Donald Sinden, and David Warner.

Although he had studied Shakespeare at school, it was not until he saw Barton's trilogy that he apprehended just how brilliant Shakespeare was; and the overall experience of Barton's writing and the performances of the RSC had such an impact upon him, that he decided there and then to become a playwright.

He returned to London and immediately began writing short stories.

In order, he thought, to gain inspiration for his writing career, he went again to Europe followed the pathway of Ernest Hemingway through France, and Spain, spending time in Paris, partaking in the Pamplona bull run (on 7 July 1964), etc.; and, whilst he gained a new understanding of Hemingway's literary accounts of his European experiences, he found himself wanting to go back to the UK, finish his business there, and return to Australia as soon as possible, work for a short while in his family's hotel in Portland, and then, having sufficient funds to do so, move to Melbourne, and earn his living as a journalist.

== Adelaide ==
Having returned to Portland in 1964, he met a local girl, his first wife, Dawn Halliday (1943-), the daughter of Portland's Lord Mayor, local butcher, and greyhound trainer Reuben Herbert Halliday (1908-1989), and Bessie Albena Halliday (1909-1987), née Dean. They were soon married and he remained in Portland, working hard in his family's hotel, until 1972, when, he began to understand that he was not as ideally suited to the hotel business as he had once thought, and that he really wanted to become a writer, and that writing was far more important to him than operating the ever more lucrative family business.

Despite the family's strong desire for him to stay in Portland and continue to operate the family's hotel business, Ross, along with Dawn, Kendal, and Kimberly, left for Adelaide and settled there. He was convinced that the isolation of knowing no-one in Adelaide, and the overall creative atmosphere that generally surrounded the Adelaide Festival of Arts, would allow him to pour all of his efforts into his writing.

As he was finding his feet as a writer, he supported his family by working for Frank Brady at his enterprise, P.J. Brady Billiard Tables. With the congenial atmosphere of Adelaide, and the financial security of working for Frank Brady, Ross's writing began to take off.

His first play, Don't Piddle Against the Wind, Mate was accepted (in 1977) by the Australian National Playwrights' Conference; and, at that conference, he met Ray Lawler, who invited him to breakfast, offered professional support, and introduced him to John Sumner. As a consequence of that introduction, John Sumner, soon agreed to direct Ross's second play, Breaker Morant.

== Breaker Morant: Play into Movie ==
Ross's play, Breaker Morant: A Play in Two Acts, which was first performed in Melbourne on 2 February 1978 by the Melbourne Theatre Company, was such a commercial and artistic success, that work started immediately to convert the script of the play into a screenplay.

Ross worked on the film as an advisor to the scriptwriters, and the film was entirely based on Ross's play.

The film was a top performer at the 1980 Australian Film Institute awards, with ten wins. It was also nominated for the 1981 Academy Award for the Best Writing (Screenplay Based on Material from Another Medium).

He wrote the play about Breaker Morant. it was adapted by three other writers into Breaker Morant, a film that received multiple awards and nominations. Among them, it was an Academy Award Nominee for the Oscar: Best Writing, Screenplay Based on Material from Another Medium for the screen writers: Jonathan Hardy; David Stevens, and Bruce Beresford. It was also a nominee for the David di Donatello Awards 1981 for the David, best Foreign Screenplay (Migliore Sceneggiatura Straniera), represented by Bruce Beresford. It is rated as one of the best Trial films of all time. It details a court martial of Australian soldiers, including Harry 'Breaker' Morant, by their British commanders in the aftermath of the Boer War in South Africa. The film details the tribulations of the defense counsel and the defendants, as they try to throw a wrench into the administrative gears of Morant's court martial. Anticipating the Nuremberg trials and the defense of "superior orders", the soldiers' main defense is that they were doing their duty as they understood it, and following orders and policy from above. Nevertheless, this "kangaroo court" moves to its inevitable conclusion. The film was nominated for a number of Academy Awards.

== Legal action against Angus & Robertson ==
Once it became known that the film version of Breaker Morant was near release, the Australian publishing house Angus & Robertson re-issued an out-of-print, remaindered and not widely known 1973 novel, The Breaker, that had been written by Kit Denton.

It was issued with great gusto, with the original 1973 front cover, plus the factually incorrect announcement on the cover: "Soon to be a major film".

This announcement was incorrect for two reasons:

- it was Ross's play, not Denton's book, that was being made into a movie, and
- Denton's book was never used to create any part of the film script (a script for which Ross had been one of the writing team from start to finish).

In 1980, Ross took legal action against Angus & Robertson in the Supreme Court of South Australia for re-issuing the 1973 book with the factually incorrect announcement on the cover. With the support of crucial evidence provided by the film's director Bruce Beresford, Ross won his case. Angus & Robertson withdrew the 1979 version of Denton's book from sale, and trashed all the remaining copies.

Another, "revised" version of Denton's book (minus the cover announcement, and with a picture of actor Edward Woodward on the cover) was issued by Angus & Robertson in 1980, which sold considerably more copies than his earlier, 1973 version.

Ross's emphatic legal victory did not receive a lot of publicity at the time; and many people today still labour under the misapprehension that it was Kit Denton's 1973 book that was the source for the movie.

=== Denton's 1984 account ===
In a 1984 interview conducted by Barry Renfrew, the Sydney bureau chief for Associated Press, Denton directly addressed the issue of whether the screenplay of Beresford's movie had been based, in any way, upon his earlier work.

The British-born Denton was most emphatic that in the process of his research in England for the project that eventually culminated in the publication of his novel, The Breaker, in 1973, he had met so much resistance from War Office officials to all of his attempts to identify, isolate, and view the pertinent official records that were associated with Morant, the charges laid against him, his trial, and his execution, that "after weeks of futile waiting, he [Denton] decided British officials were concealing the facts and he began to accept Australian claims that Morant had been sacrificed as a colonial subject".

In despair, Denton returned to Australia, and began to work on a screenplay about Morant.

No-one displayed any interest of any kind in developing Denton's proposed screenplay. However, the Sydney publisher, Angus & Robertson, suggested that some of his artistic effort might be rescued if he was able to re-work his screenplay into a novel. Denton substantially re-worked his screenplay into the book that was published in 1973.

In the 1984 interview, Denton was most emphatic that (a) he himself, (b) his earlier draft screenplay, and (c) his later novel "[were] not involved with the film [of Beresford in any way]".

== Later work ==
After Ross had finished with his work as an advisor to the scriptwriters for the film Breaker Morant, his services were commissioned on numerous occasions by interested parties in Australia and the United States to write film treatments on their behalf; however, quite a few of these otherwise promising potential projects did not proceed due to the effects of the 2008 financial crisis on the film industry and its backers.

He wrote several scripts for episodes of the Australian television shows Carson's Law, and Rafferty's Rules.

He has also fully developed several other film scripts that have been purchased, but have not yet begun production; and, also, one of his fully developed film scripts (working title Sunburnt Heroes) is in pre-production.

He has also mentored several emerging writers, and has completed a manual for writers that is soon to be published.

He has completed a novel, a spy thriller, To Skin a Cat, which has been placed with a publisher; and as well, has returned to the stage, writing an entirely new play (working title L, V AND P), concerning Laurence Olivier, Vivien Leigh, and Peter Finch.

For a number of years he was the South Australian representative of the Australian Writers' Guild

== Works ==
=== Drama ===
- The Right Man (1977); Sheridan Theatre, North Adelaide, 1977.
- Don't Piddle Against the Wind, Mate (1977); Jane Street Theatre, Randwick, July 1977; directed by John Tasker.
- Breaker Morant: A Play in Two Acts (1978); Athenaeum Theatre, Melbourne, January 1978; directed by John Sumner.

Breaker Morant was nominated for an AWGIE Award

- You're Mine, Alice (1978); Little Theatre, Adelaide, February 1978.
- Sound of Silence (1979); Balcony Theatre, Adelaide, July 1979; directed by John Noble.

Sound of Silence was nominated for an AWGIE Award

- The Secret Life of Mr Gibney: The Fantasy Life of an Aging English Schoolmaster (1980); Nimrod Downstairs, Surry Hills, March 1980.
- The Death of Danko: The Last Days of Maxim Gorky (1981); Space Theatre, Adelaide, April 1981; directed by Brian Debnam.
- The Right Man; or, The Political Elevation Of Harold (1982); Phillip Street Theatre, Sydney, January 1982; directed by Gary Baxter.
- Sorry, Sold Out (1982); Space Theatre, Adelaide, December 1982; directed by John Dick.
- The World Of Mr Gibney (1983).

=== Musical play ===
- Norman Lindsay and his Push in Bohemia (1980) — "A rollicking new musical romp through the Bohemian life and times of Australian poet, painter and folk-hero, Norman Lindsay" — Performed as part of the Adelaide Festival of Arts, at the Small Price Theatre, Adelaide, March 1980.

=== Screenplays (film) advisor ===
- Breaker Morant (1980) (directed by Bruce Beresford)

=== Screenplays (film) ===
- Out of the Body (1989) (directed by Brian Trenchard-Smith)
- Dancing on Glass (1999) (directed by Kenneth G. Ross)

=== Screenplays (telemovies) ===
- The Schippan Mystery (1984); Australian Broadcasting Corporation TV; directed by Di Drew; first broadcast on 22 September 1984.

=== Other ===
- A Note from the Playwright (1979)
- "Breaker" Morant – Posh Larrikin (1990)
- The Truth about Harry (2002)

== See also ==
- Breaker Morant (play) – Play written by Kenneth G. Ross
- Breaker Morant (film) – 1980 film by Bruce Beresford
- Breaker Morant – British officer executed for war crimes (1864–1902)
- Court martial of Breaker Morant – 1902 prosecution of six British Army soldiers for crimes during the Second Boer War
- Pardon for Morant, Handcock and Witton – Petitions for Australian Second Boer War soldiers
- List of Caulfield Grammar School people
