= Breaker Morant =

British officer executed for war crimes (1864–1902)

Harry Harbord Morant
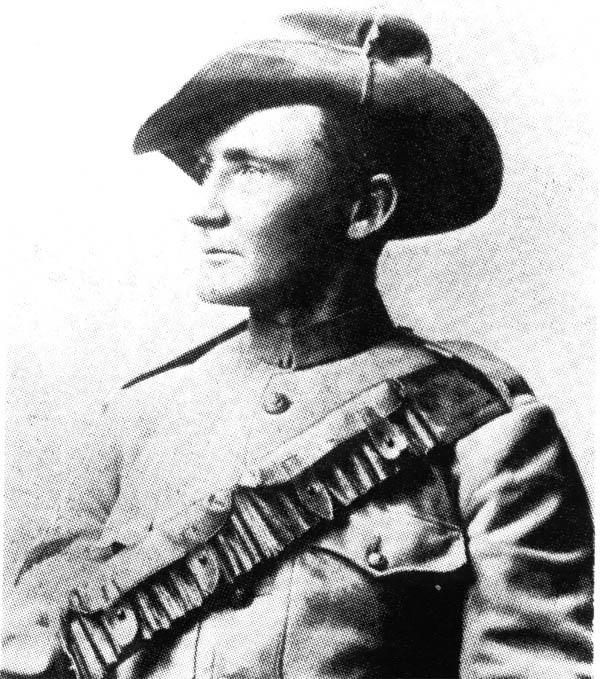
- Harry "The Breaker" Harbord Morant, c. 1900
- Born: Edwin Henry Murrant; 9 December 1864; Bridgwater, Somerset, England
- Died: 27 February 1902 (aged 37); Pretoria, South African Republic
- Cause of death: Execution by firing squad
- Resting place: Church Street Cemetery, Pretoria, South Africa
- Spouse: Daisy May O'Dwyer (1884; separated)
- Status: Executed
- Conviction: Murder (12 counts)
- Trial: Court-martial of Breaker Morant
- Penalty: Death

Details
- Victims: 12
- Span of crimes: August – 7 September 1901
- Country: South African Republic
- Targets: POWs and civilians
- Military career
- Allegiance: British Empire
- Service years: 1899–1902
- Rank: Lieutenant
- Nickname: The Breaker
- Units: South Australian Mounted Rifles; Bushveldt Carbineers
- Conflicts: Second Boer War

Harry Harbord "Breaker" Morant (born Edwin Henry Murrant, 9 December 1864 – 27 February 1902) was an English horseman, bush balladist, military officer and war criminal who was convicted and executed for murdering nine prisoners-of-war (POWs) and three captured civilians in three separate incidents during the Second Boer War.

Morant travelled to the Australian colonies in 1883 and for more than fifteen years he worked in a variety of occupations in Queensland, New South Wales and South Australia, during which time he developed a reputation as a horseman and bush balladist. In 1899 he enlisted in the second contingent of the South Australian Mounted Rifles to be sent by the government of that colony to serve as part of the British Empire forces fighting in South Africa during the Second Boer War. Morant embarked as a corporal and ended his term of service as a sergeant, having spent much of his time as a despatch rider. He then returned to England for six months while he unsuccessfully sought to clear some debts.

Returning to South Africa, Morant received a commission as a lieutenant with an irregular regiment – the Bushveldt Carbineers. He was arrested and court-martialled for committing murder on active service – one of the first such prosecutions in British military history. According to military prosecutors, Morant retaliated for the death in combat of his squadron commander – a close friend – with a series of revenge killings against both Boer POWs and many civilian residents of the Northern Transvaal. Morant's defence attorney, Major James Francis Thomas, asserted that his clients should be acquitted, claiming that they were acting in accordance with superior orders not to take prisoners. Despite this, Thomas was unable to establish that an order to that effect had been issued.

Morant was accused of the summary execution of Floris Visser, a wounded POW, and the slaying of four Afrikaners and four Dutch schoolteachers who had surrendered at the Elim Hospital, five of whom were members of the Soutpansberg Commando. Morant was found guilty and sentenced to death. Morant and Lieutenant Peter Handcock were then court-martialled for the murder of the Reverend Carl August Daniel Heese, a South African–born Minister of the Berlin Missionary Society. Heese had spiritually counselled the Dutch and Afrikaner victims at Elim Hospital and had been shot to death the same afternoon. Morant and Handcock were acquitted of the Heese murder, but their sentences for murdering Visser, the eight victims at Elim Hospital, and three others were implemented by a firing squad from the Cameron Highlanders on 27 February 1902.

Morant and Handcock have become folk heroes in modern Australia, representing a turning point for Australians' self-determination and independence from British rule. Their court-martial and death have been the subject of books, a stage play and an award-winning Australian New Wave film by director Bruce Beresford. Upon its release during 1980, Beresford's film both brought Morant's life story to a worldwide audience and "hoisted the images of the accused officers to the level of Australian icons and martyrs". Despite the seriousness of the evidence and charges against them, some modern Australians regard Morant and Handcock as scapegoats or even as victims of judicial murder. They continue to attempt, with some public support, to obtain a posthumous pardon or even a new trial.

According to South African historian Charles Leach, "In the opinion of many South Africans, particularly descendants of victims as well as other involved persons in the far Northern Transvaal, justice was only partially achieved by the trial and the resultant sentences. The feeling still prevails that not all the guilty parties were dealt with – the notorious Captain Taylor being the most obvious one of all."

== Early life in England ==
Edwin Henry Murrant was born at Bridgwater, Somerset, England, on 9 December 1864. According to his Queensland marriage record, he was the son of Edwin Murrant and Catherine Murrant (née O'Reilly). Edwin and Catherine were master and matron of the Union Workhouse at Bridgwater. Morant's father died in August 1864, four months before Edwin Henry was born. Despite her reduced circumstances following her husband's death, after four applications and help from her contacts Catherine was able send her son to the local Royal Masonic Institution for Boys. He received prizes for French, German, classics, dictation and elocution, but also constantly misbehaved and influenced other boys to join him in his misdemeanours. Catherine continued as matron of the workhouse until her retirement in early 1882, having completed 21 year service. She died in July 1899.

== Australia (1883–1899) ==
Morant (still using the name Edwin Murrant) arrived in Queensland aboard the SS Waroonga when it docked in Townsville on 5 June 1883. At the time, there was no difference in legal status, in either country, between people born in the UK and British subjects born overseas – a category that included a vast majority of people born in the Australian colonies. This did not change until the Australian nationality law of 1948. Morant did not regard himself as Australian. His former defence counsel, Major James Francis Thomas, later "reacted strongly" whenever his former client was described as such. In a letter to The Sydney Morning Herald on 16 June 1923, Thomas wrote, "Morant was not an Australian, he was an Englishman, who came to this country for 'colonial experience'."

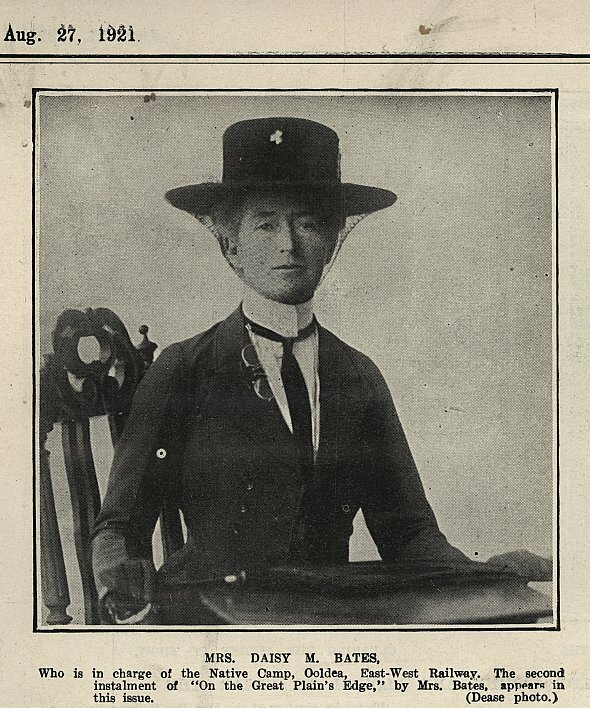
Daisy May O'Dwyer Morant

Soon after arriving in north Queensland, Murrant joined a travelling circus/rodeo which was making its way to the mining town of Charters Towers – about 136 km (85 mi) south west of Townsville – and upon arrival he made an immediate impression on the locals with his drinking, jokes, ballads, horse riding and pursuit of women. He was employed as a stockman at Fanning Downs Station on the Burdekin River – about 20 km (12 mi) east of Charters Towers – where he met the governess, Daisy May O'Dwyer. A brief courtship resulted in marriage at Charters Towers on 13 March 1884 – the marriage registration gives his name as Edwin Henry Murrant – but this was short-lived, as he failed to pay the officiating minister his fee of five pounds and his new wife threw him out. Murrant had promised the minister that the necessary funds would be arriving soon from his aristocratic family in England, but the money never came.

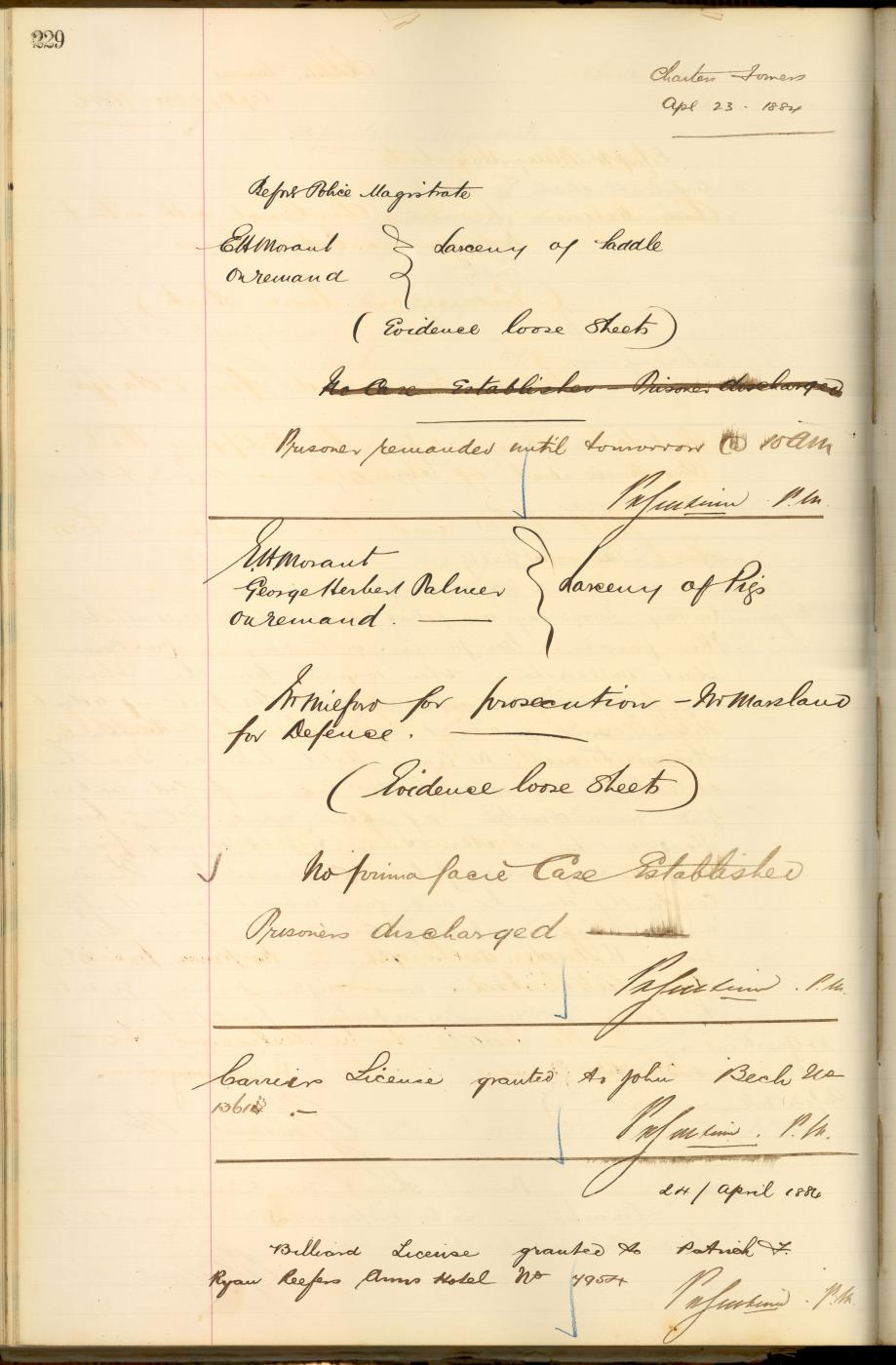
'Breaker' Morant on Remand, 1884

Four weeks after their marriage, Murrant was charged with stealing a saddle and thirty-two pigs. When arrested, he began denying writing false cheques until he realised he was being arrested for stealing instead. He then used two cheques – which were soon dishonoured – to buy two horses. He went to the town of Winton – about 465 km (289 mi) further to the south west, but was acquitted of the stealing charges. His wife, who later became Daisy Bates – a noted anthropologist – never divorced him or revealed her early connection to Murrant/Morant.

After this, Murrant assumed the name Harry Harbord Morant, but was also known to use the surname alias Harbord to avoid creditors. He often claimed to have been born in 1865 in Devon, and to be the son of Admiral Sir George Digby Morant of the Royal Navy, a claim repeated as fact in a book published soon after his execution. Admiral Morant released a statement in 1902 that the executed man was not his son and was not in any way related to him. The author Nick Bleszynski uses circumstantial evidence to theorise that Admiral Morant could have been Edwin Murrant's biological father, predominantly citing geographic proximity and questions about the funding of Murrant's education. Other recent books such as the 2020 biography of Morant by Peter FitzSimons dismiss as fictitious Morant's claims that he was the son of Admiral Morant. Morant also claimed to have studied at the Royal Naval College, but none of his names appear in naval records.

During the next fifteen years, Morant travelled around southern Queensland, New South Wales and South Australia, being employed variously as a horse-breaker, drover, rouseabout, rough rider, horse trader, bush newspaperman, bookkeeper and storeman. He gained a reputation for his horsemanship, including as a steeplechaser and polo player, and also as drinker and womaniser. A contemporary described him thus:

A shortish man, large features, small eyes (too close together), clean shaven, his skin red with alcohol, a horsey look about his dress, the manners and speech of a gentleman, of surprising physical courage (particularly on horseback), quite destitute of moral courage or moral principle; fond of exercise in the way of sport, he would never willingly exert himself to earn an honest shilling if he could borrow it off no matter whom; a confirmed dipsomaniac.

Morant shamelessly drew upon the generosity of others – often claiming to have been robbed – and routinely failed to pay back loans or pay bills he owed, moving on before the debts caught up with him. In 1889, while in Blackall in central western Queensland, Morant was arrested, charged and convicted of obtaining money under false pretences from a man in Muttaburra – for selling the same horse to two different men – and was sentenced to three months hard labour in Rockhampton jail. The warrant for his arrest described him as 173 centimetres (5 ft 8 in) tall, stout build, with brown hair and moustache, slight stammer in speech and "boasts of aristocratic friends in England".

Along with his propensity to avoid repaying loans and paying debts, Morant also had a reputation for animal cruelty and for goading Aboriginal stockmen into bare-knuckle fistfights. Morant would encourage an Aboriginal stockman to fight a few rounds with him by initially hiding his true boxing skills, then reveal them by beating him severely. He developed skills as a bush balladist, and from 1891 many of his ballads or poems were published in The Bulletin, using the sobriquets "The Breaker", "The B", "B", Harry Morant, HM, and "Apollo Beledere". Through this work, which helped fund his drinking, he made the acquaintance of the famous Australian bush poets Henry Lawson, Banjo Paterson, and Will Ogilvie. The bond between Morant and Ogilvie was quite strong, and Ogilvie wrote several pieces about Morant both before and after his death.

One of the most well-known demonstrations of Morant's horsemanship occurred in 1897 at the Hawkesbury Show, north west of Sydney in New South Wales. A rough rider had brought a notoriously wild brumby called "Dargin's Grey" to the show, an eight-year-old but very muscular horse known to throw all who attempted to ride it. For over a minute, Morant rode the violently bucking horse into submission, popularising his nickname "The Breaker". In 1898, while still working in the Hawkesbury region, Morant associated with the Sydney hunt club set, through which he first made the acquaintance of a prominent Sydney solicitor, Robert Lenehan, the Mahdist War and Burma veteran Lieutenant Colonel Henry Parke Airey, and Thomas – who later became Morant's defence lawyer when he was court martialed in South Africa. Thomas had travelled from his home in Tenterfield to participate in a hunt. On 5 November 1898 one of Morant's other acquaintances was convicted by the Penrith Police Court for being drunk and disorderly at Springwood in the nearby Blue Mountains. A summons had been issued for Morant to appear on the same charge, but it had not been served because he had fled to Gunnedah in north eastern New South Wales.

Around this time, Morant's personal circumstances were increasingly straitened, and this continued until early 1900 as he reached his mid-30s. Pursued by many creditors, he was no longer young, his clothes were shabby, he looked careworn, and his alcohol-affected facial features were less attractive to women. He had to flee Melbourne in Victoria after only a month, and travelled to Adelaide in South Australia where he also quickly wore out his welcome. He retreated to a cattle station outside Renmark on the Murray River 250 km (160 mi) north east of Adelaide, where he obtained free food and accommodation by convincing a local member of the Morant clan that he was a relative. Having few prospects if he remained in Australia, Morant soon gathered a few members of the local rifle club and rode back to Adelaide to enlist for service in the Second Boer War.

== To South Africa ==
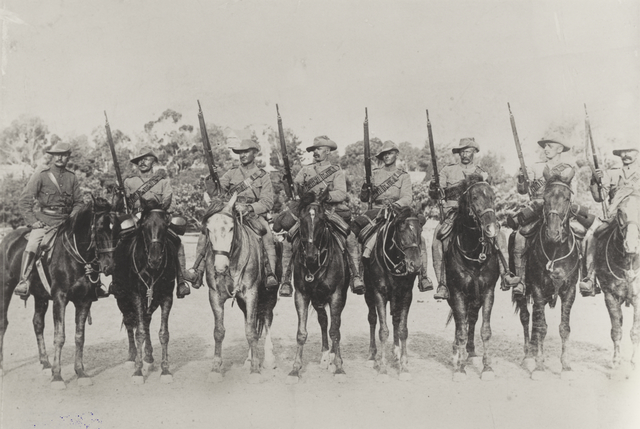
Members of the Second Contingent of the South Australian Mounted Rifles prior to their departure for South Africa. Morant is third from the left

On 13 January 1900, Morant enlisted – under the name Henry Horland Morrant – with the second contingent of the South Australian Mounted Rifles (SAMR) in Adelaide, for service in the Second Boer War. According to a report in The Advertiser – a daily newspaper – Morant, like the other volunteers, read and signed a declaration that he would faithfully serve until 17 October 1900, be subject to the Queen's rules and regulations and the rules and articles of war. Along with the rest of the contingent, Morant visited the summer residence of South Australia's governor, Hallam, Lord Tennyson – the son of Alfred, Lord Tennyson – at Marble Hill and regaled the governor and his wife with stories. After completing his training, he was appointed as a corporal and the contingent embarked for the Transvaal on 26 January 1900.

The contingent disembarked at Cape Town on 27 February 1900, and were at first sent to Prieska in the Cape Colony to join a force under the command of Major General Baron Kitchener. It was then sent back to De Aar on the railway line between Cape Town and Kimberley from where it was moved up to Bloemfontein where it joined other Australian troops as part of the main advance to Pretoria under Field Marshal Baron Roberts. Lieutenant General John French commanded the Cavalry Division, which was struggling with the quantity and quality of the horses it had been supplied, many of which came from Argentina and Hungary. The British had not anticipated the tactics the Boer commandos would use, and were ill-prepared for the war of mobility forced upon them. French became aware of Morant's knowledge and skill with horses, and arranged for him to be transferred to his remount section, where he broke in newly arrived horses, and by non-regulation methods obtained better horses for the staff, often under the cover of darkness. French also utilised Morant as a despatch rider for his staff.

After the capture of Pretoria, South Australian Colonel Joseph Gordon recommended Morant as a despatch rider to Bennet Burleigh, the war correspondent of the London Daily Telegraph, and Morant took up this position in late June 1900. He was employed directly by the newspaper, and his final pay from the British Army was on 31 July 1900. Morant's physical bravery and horse riding skills ensured he performed well in his new role as a despatch rider for Burleigh, riding hard with the war correspondent's reports to the nearest telegraph station. Burleigh and Morant followed closely behind Lord Roberts' advance from Pretoria to the border with Portuguese East Africa, and Burleigh was present with Roberts in Durban when the latter had declared that the war was practically over.

== Visit to England ==
By late September 1900, with Burleigh accepting Roberts' contention that the war was almost over, Morant decided to travel to England with the war correspondent when he returned home. To keep his options open for a return to South Africa, he attempted to secure a place with the police force being established by Major General Robert Baden-Powell – the South African Constabulary – to safeguard law and order in the occupied Boer republics. For help with this task Morant looked to useful bureaucrats in the administration. One of these was Lieutenant Percy Hunt, a regular British Army officer formerly of the 13th Hussars who, like Morant, was a lover of both horses and polo.

The two quickly struck up a friendship. At the time, Hunt was a marriage registrar in the administration, and had served with the scouts of Lieutenant General John French's cavalry division earlier in the war, but had seen little action. Hunt, an aristocratic officer with excellent social connections – who was nearly ten years Morant's junior – gave Morant some contacts of his to get in touch with when he arrived in London. The Second Contingent of the SAMR returned to South Australia in October, and the commanding officer wrote a farewell letter of recommendation for Morant noting his satisfaction with Morant's "soldierly behaviour and continual alertness" while part of the contingent.

Morant and Burleigh arrived in Cape Town in late October and stayed at the palatial Mount Nelson Hotel where they wined and dined for several days awaiting the departure of their ship to England. Morant claimed that he did not have the funds immediately available to pay his extensive hotel bill, but that it should be forwarded to Admiral Morant in Devon and would be promptly paid. The manager agreed. Morant and Burleigh departed Cape Town aboard the Dunvegan Castle, arriving in London in late November.

As soon as he arrived in London, Morant visited the Agent-General for South Australia – the former premier, Sir John Cockburn, and told him that he had been commissioned in the South African Constabulary as a lieutenant. He then forwarded an account of the meeting to journalist friends in Adelaide, and the Adelaide Observer duly printed it a month later. In it, Morant made three false claims: that he was the son of a Colonel Morant of Renmark; that he had been commissioned as a lieutenant in the South African Constabulary; and that he was on six month's leave of absence before taking up his appointment back in South Africa.

A letter dated 23 January 1901 was sent to Admiral Morant by the Mount Nelson Hotel stating that Harry Morant had stayed there during November 1900, while claiming to be the Admiral's son. Harry Morant had further claimed to be a war correspondent for the Daily Telegraph and had "left without discharging his liability" of sixteen pounds and thirteen shillings. The letter concluded, "We shall esteem it a favour if you will let us know the course we had better adopt. We are averse to taking the matter to court till we had heard from you." This letter arrived at Brockenhurst Park, the home of a branch of the Morant clan, but Admiral Morant did not live there. The letter was received in early February 1901 by Flora Morant, whose late husband was a cousin of the admiral. She consulted with her solicitor and replied with a formal note advising the hotel that the admiral did not know the man referred to in their letter, and would not be held liable for his debts.

In early February, Morant participated in the funeral procession of Queen Victoria wearing the uniform of a lieutenant in the South African Constabulary. He was noticed by an Australian journalist who spoke to him and wrote in a South Australian newspaper published in March that "Lieutenant Morant, of B. P. P. [Baden-Powell's Police], who went out with the Second Contingent as [a] corporal, is now in England, and is visiting friends in Devonshire." In reality, Morant was not at this time a member of the British Army or the South African Constabulary, and held no rank.

Whatever his aims, Morant did not have a very successful visit to England. He mostly stayed with his unmarried sister Annie, who resented his long absence with little communication, and beyond a few trips to London to mix with a few people who knew his exploits, his visit only served to remind him of his unimpressive personal circumstances. According to FitzSimons, he had no future in England and could not return to Australia due to his debts and criminal past. Despite the fact that he did not have a commission in the South African Constabulary, he returned to South Africa in March 1901 hoping that other opportunities might present themselves.

== With the Bushveldt Carbineers ==
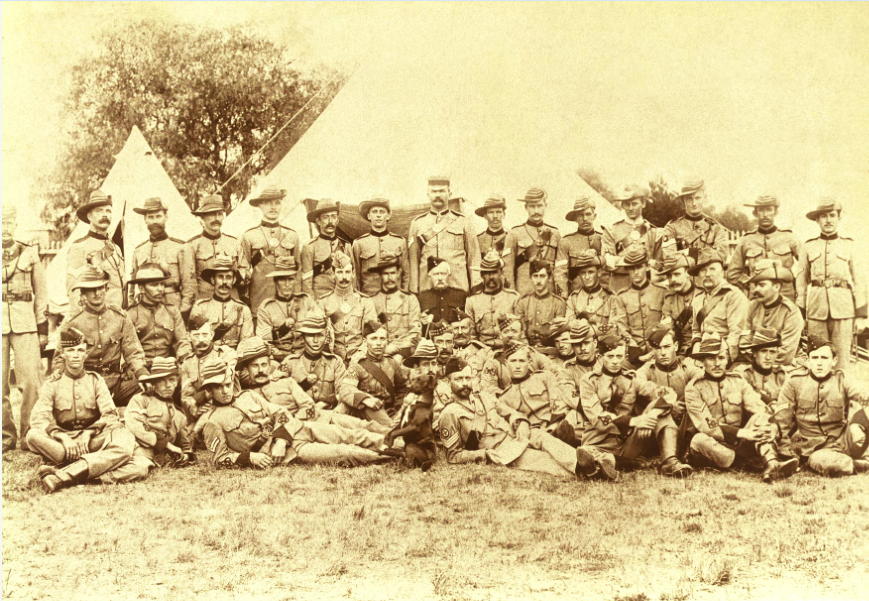
Morant was a junior officer in the Bushveldt Carbineers, an irregular British Army unit that included many Australians.

After their defeats in open battle during 1899–1900, the bittereinders – the Boers who were willing to fight the British to the "bitter end" – began a guerrilla campaign against British forces. In response, Baron Kitchener – now a substantive lieutenant general, local general and overall British commander in South Africa – implemented and expanded several counterinsurgency policies, which included destroying Boer farmsteads which could support the bittereinders and interning Afrikaner non-combatants into concentration camps. Family members of known bittereinders had their rations in the camps halved. As they were no longer able to receive food and supplies from Boer civilians, the commandos began a practice of derailing trains in order to take and use food and supplies that were intended for British forces.

In response to the depredations of the commandos in the northern Transvaal, some loyalist businessmen in the Zoutpansberg district approached Kitchener and received approval for the raising of an irregular British mounted infantry regiment to consist of loyalist Boers from the district. In mid-February 1901, the provost marshal in Pretoria was tasked with establishing the regiment, initially titled the Bushveldt Mounted Rifles, but quickly renamed the Bushveldt Carbineers (BVC), The numbers of such men who came forward fell far short of the five hundred needed to form the unit, the loyalty of some of those who did was dubious, and the newly appointed commanding officer, the Australian Major Robert Lenehan, received authority to recruit time-served Australians and other colonials still in South Africa. By late March the BVC was ready for action – although only 320-strong – and was included in Brigadier General Herbert Plumer's column as it drove north along the railway line towards Pietersburg – 180 miles (290 km) north of Pretoria – on 26 March. On 1 April Plumer's force entered Nylstroom, about 135 miles (217 km) north of Pretoria.

On arrival in South Africa inquiring about opportunities, Morant was referred to Lenehan, and while Lenehan later stated that his impression of Morant in Australia would not have induced him to offer him a commission as an officer, he felt that previous Morant's service in South Africa had made him more suitable. Lenehan was also swayed by Morant's false claim that he had previously been granted a commission in the South African Constabulary. On 1 April 1901 Lenehan granted Morant a commission as a lieutenant in the BVC and sent him to join the regiment on its advance north.

Between 1 and 8 April, Plumer's column, including the BVC, pushed north and occupied Pietersburg. On the advance to Pietersburg, the BVC was tasked with responding to Boer mining of the railway line near Potgietersrus, and developed a practice of placing Boer prisoners in the second and subsequent trucks ahead of a locomotive, with an empty truck leading. When the empty lead truck was blown up by a mine and one of the trucks carrying the prisoners was damaged, the prisoners became more forthcoming about mining of the tracks further along the line. Once Pietersburg was secured, Colonel Francis Hall of the Royal Artillery was appointed as area commandant based in Pietersburg, in overall command of the BVC and two infantry units: the 2nd Battalion, the Gordon Highlanders (2GH); and the 2nd Battalion, the Wiltshire Regiment (2WR). Lenehan also established the BVC headquarters in Pietersburg. As district commissioner responsible for the civil administration, and also intelligence chief for the district, Kitchener appointed Captain Alfred Taylor. Taylor was known as Bulala (Killer) by the local African people due to his well-established reputation for ruthless brutality.

The BVC area of operations was the Zoutpansberg district – nearly one third of the Transvaal – was bounded by the Limpopo River to the north and the Waterberg range and Olifants River to the south. On 4 May, Morant led the 22-strong No. 1 Troop of B Squadron of the BVC from Pietersburg to establish themselves at a base occupied by two companies of 2WR at Strydpoort Pass near Potgietersrus, south west of Pietersburg. Morant's second-in-command was Sergeant Frank Eland, a settler from the district who Morant considered an excellent non-commissioned officer and with whom he quickly established a warm friendship. In the early morning the day after arriving at Strydpoort, Morant took a patrol out, following receipt of intelligence, and captured five Boers without casualties.

The troop mounted daily patrols and often escorted officers travelling between their base and Pietersburg. No. 2 Troop was established at the nearby Chuniespoort Pass. On 16 May Morant paraded his troop and read a message from Kitchener praising the BVC for its good work. A concentration camp was established near Pietersburg on 11 May, and within a month it held 2,000 Boers, and sometimes as many as 4,000. During its brief existence, 88 women prisoners, 523 children and 46 men held in the camp died. On 22 May the BVC were ordered to move their camp some 1.6–2.4 km (1–1.5 mi) out from the pass, and Eland directed the establishment of the defences while Morant took nine BVC men to escort a party of Boers to the concentration camp, returning three days later.

On 1 June, Morant and Eland unsuccessfully sought permission from the major in charge of the 2WR troops at Strydpoort to conduct a 110 km (70 mi) patrol. Morant travelled several times between the new camp near Strydpoort and Pietersburg in the first half of June. In mid-June, Morant's friend Hunt, whose service as a marriage registrar with the civil administration had come to an end, used his contacts at the Pretoria Club to secure himself a position as a captain with the BVC, although he did not reach Pietersberg until early July. At the end of June, both troops of B Squadron concentrated at Pietersburg to prepare to move further north, and they were replaced by 40 men from C Squadron reinforced with a few troopers from B Squadron who remained.

On 4 July, a platoon of 2GH led by Lieutenant Alexander Best were guarding a train which was blown up near Potgietersrus then attacked by a force of Boers numbering around 150. Holding out for as long as they could, ten of the Gordons, including Best, were killed, and eleven wounded. Eland recorded in a letter to his wife that Morant was very upset by the news of Best's death, as Best had been a friend of Morant. Morant led a fruitless patrol that evening, and Eland wrote that "if we had come up with that party of Boers that night we would not have taken any prisoners". Hunt was also a friend of Best. The following evening, Morant was member of a night patrol led by the adjutant of the BVC, Lieutenant Edwards, which was accused of overzealousness in searching a house that had been placed under the protection of the British Army to the extent that Edwards was briefly placed under arrest upon his return to Pietersberg. When the patrol returned to camp, Morant was not his usual talkative self. He claimed to Eland that Best and his men had been shot in cold blood by the Boers.

=== A Squadron at Sweetwaters Farm ===
In early June, Taylor had been accompanied by 60 men of A Squadron of the BVC commanded by Captain James Robertson to establish a base at Sweetwaters Farm about 130 km (80 mi) north of Pietersberg in the Spelonken region. One of the officers accompanying A Squadron was Veterinary Lieutenant Peter Handcock. A Boer commando led by Christiaan Frederik Beyers withdrew from the area when it learned of the approach of the BVC, but soon after the BVC established camp, the retired Boer leader Tom Kelly gathered his followers and re-established his own commando, as he was unable to accept British occupation of his territory. Another Boer leader, Ben Viljoen, was also active in the area, and the area of operations was far more active than the relatively quiescent area then being patrolled by B Squadron.

Taylor recruited a team of intelligence operatives drawn from local Boers, and the task of A Squadron was to assist Taylor by following up on intelligence he gathered about Boer movements. Robertson was unsuited to his command, permissive with the men and not respected by them. He distrusted his men to the extent that he kept a loaded pistol at hand at all times. Soon after arriving at Sweetwaters Farm, Taylor was accompanying a BVC patrol when he questioned an African local about the whereabouts of the Boers. When the man failed to provide any information, Taylor shot him in the head at close range.

On 2 July, Taylor received intelligence that a group of six Boers in two covered wagons were approaching Sweetwaters Farm to surrender. After conferring with Taylor and Handcock, Robertson ordered the squadron sergeant major, Kenneth Morrison, to send out a patrol to meet the Boers and shoot them rather than take them prisoner. When questioned by Morrison, Robertson couched the orders as coming from Taylor as the district commander. In fact, Taylor had no military authority to issue such orders, and Robertson was in command. When Morrison passed these orders on to Sergeant Dudley Oldham as coming from Taylor, Oldham initially refused to carry them out, but reluctantly did so when pressed.

Upon approaching the Boers, who were also herding one hundred head of oxen, Oldham's advanced patrol of seven men fired a few shots, but no fire was returned and white flags were waved to signify surrender. The Boers, who included 12-year-old Petrus Geyser and a sick old man, were disarmed and then shot by the side of the road, and in the case of the old man, while he lay in a wagon. The Boers offered no resistance at all. Taylor, Robertson and Handcock arrived at the scene some time afterwards to inspect the bodies, and their burial by local Africans was arranged. Taylor visited the nearby African kraal from which the three grave diggers had been drawn, and when he did not get the answers he wanted from them about what they would say about the shooting of the six Boers, they fled the kraal. Taylor sent a BVC patrol to find and shoot them, which they did. The oxen captured by the patrol were soon sent, with Morrison's connivance, to Taylor's farm in southern Rhodesia, a mere 48 km (30 mi) away.

One of the BVC troopers who had been a member of Oldham's patrol that shot the six surrendering Boers was Barend van Buuren, himself a Boer. Disturbed by what had happened, that evening he approached relatives of the dead Boers who were being held in at the camp, and pointed out the members of the patrol who had shot them. Several BVC members witnessed this interaction, and Handcock confronted him. The following morning van Buuren spoke to a member of the BVC about his disquiet. That day, Taylor and Robertson ordered Handcock to take out a patrol, to include van Buuren, and during the patrol, kill van Buuren when the opportunity arose, on the basis that he could not be relied upon to keep quiet about the killing of the six Boers. Once in thick bush, Handcock spread the patrol out to the extent that they could not always see the next man on their left or right, and rode up to van Buuren and shot him three times with his revolver. Upon returning to camp, Handcock submitted a report on van Buuren's death which Robertson considered unacceptable. He rewrote the report and forwarded it to Lenehan. In usual circumstances a patrol would have been sent out to retrieve van Buuren's body so it could be buried, but this was not done. Several BVC members did not believe that Boers were involved in van Buuren's death, and concluded that Handcock had murdered him. If Handcock heard anyone dissent from his version of the events surrounding van Buuren's death, he threatened to shoot them.

In early July, a report from an intelligence agent operating in the northern Transvaal was received by Hall in Pietersberg alleging "poor discipline, unconfirmed murders, drunkenness, and general lawlessness in the Spelonken". The report also alleged that Robertson had sexually assaulted a Boer woman. In response, on 11 July – the afternoon of Best's funeral – Hall sent Hunt, Morant and Lieutenant Charles Hannam, along with about 60 BVC troops of B Squadron, to relieve Robertson and A Squadron, who were to proceed to Pietersberg immediately. Hunt was to assume command of a new base, which was to be established around a portable steel fort about 1.6 km (1 mi) from Sweetwaters Farm, soon dubbed "Fort Edward" after the new king, Edward VII. Hunt's command arrived at Sweetwaters Farm on 13 July, and Robertson and most of A Squadron set off for Pietersberg the following day. Only six troopers and a couple of officers from Robertson's command remain with Hunt; one of the retained officers was Handcock, based on Taylor's recommendation. Eland wrote to his wife that the members of A Squadron had not been glad to see B Squadron, and there were several ugly rumours about the actions of several A squadron members, to the extent that a court martial for murder might be held. Before Hunt left Pietersburg he delivered two polo ponies to Kitchener's residence in Pretoria. While there he claimed to have had a discussion with Colonel Hubert Hamilton, Kitchener's military secretary, who told him that the Zoutpansberg district was to be cleared of Boers and that no prisoners were to be taken. Once in command of B Squadron, Hunt relayed these instructions to his officers on several occasions, but they continued to bring in prisoners until after his death despite his protestations.

Robertson was given a choice between court martial and resigning his commission. Robertson submitted his resignation and quit the military.

=== B Squadron at Fort Edward ===
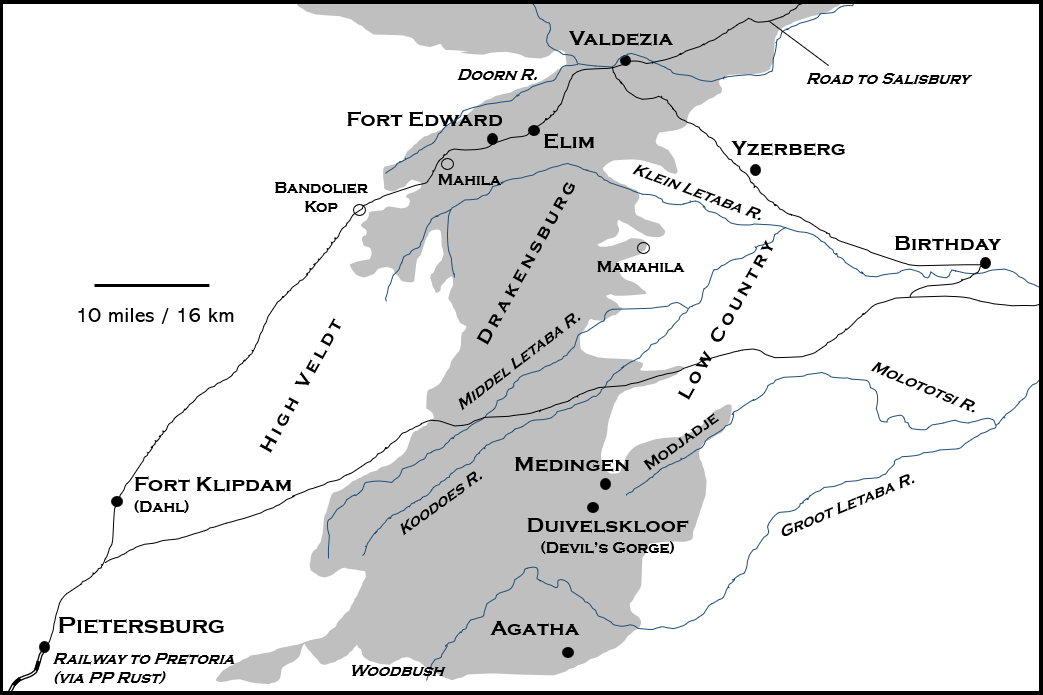
The area of operations of the Bushveldt Carbineers, northern Transvaal, 1901

While Fort Edward was being established – including the construction of barbed wire entanglements, picket barricades and entrenchments – patrolling commenced. A fifteen-man patrol under Hannam departed with four days' rations on 16 July aiming to deal with restive African people near the Letaba River. On 18 July, a parade and festivities were held to "christen" the fort, and there were several visitors, including the Reverend Fritz Reuter of the Berlin Missionary Society and his family, who ran the nearby Mendingen Mission. Reuter was on good terms with the BVC, probably due to his familiarity with the Eland family. While he was there, Reuter told Hunt that Viljoen's commando had established camp in the Duivelskloof (Devil's Gully) near the mission, from which they were harassing locals who did not support their cause. This included Eland mother at the family farm at "Ravenshill". When Reuter and his family returned to the mission, Hunt sent an escort party to protect them and to confirm the location of Viljeon's commando. The day after the parade, a twenty-man patrol under Lieutenant Picton left the fort to meet a supply convoy coming from Pietersberg. Upon meeting the convoy, several jars of rum were stolen and two members were arrested. By the time the convoy and accompanying patrol reached Fort Edward, a whole case of rum had been stolen and more arrests were made, including Morrison, who had remained behind as squadron sergeant major of B Squadron when A Squadron departed for Pietersberg. Morrison fled Fort Edward on 24 July, and an eight-man patrol under a Sergeant Gray was sent after him. They caught up with him where the stolen rum had been secreted, and joined him in drinking the rum, after which they rode on to Pietersberg. On arrival at Pietersberg, Lenehan interrogated Morrison and Gray, and after consulting with Hall, he discharged all nine from the BVC, and Morrison and Gray were ordered to leave Pietersberg. However, heavy drinking remained common at Fort Edward under Hunt's command.

On 27 July, Hunt and Handcock left Fort Edward in a cart, escorted by Eland and another sergeant. They left just after midday with half an hour's notice and headed for the Ellerton gold mine, about 89 km (55 mi) from Fort Edward. Hunt expected to meet someone at Fonseca's store – about 56 km (35 mi) from Fort Edward – so stayed overnight, but the contact did not appear. They continued on until they encountered the camp of the caretaker of the Ellerton mine, George Anderson, who had recently returned to the district after being expelled by the Boers. He told them of Lobedu people who were causing problems and would not provide any information about Boer movements. He also told them that there was a 300-strong Boer commando on the other side of the Groot Letaba River, and that Viljoen was active in the area. It was decided that Eland would conduct an unarmed liaison mission to the Lobedu people, wearing civilian clothes, as they knew him as a local farmer and were friendly towards him. He would also be able to visit his farm, "Ravenshill" which was in the area, and visit his mother. He received a briefing from one of Taylor's intelligence agents, and rode his personal horse which had no military brands. Eland was successful, visited his farm and saw his mother, and also obtained much useful information about Boer movements and some assistance from the Lobedu. On his return to the Ellerton mine camp on 26 July, he was met by a patrol led by Lieutenant Hannam, which escorted him back to Fort Edward, arriving on the morning of 30 July with three Boer prisoners they had collected near Mendingen Mission. When they arrived at Fort Edward, there were few BVC members at the fort, as Morant was out with a patrol to the west and Picton was likewise scouting to the east. Hunt praised Eland's work and reported the information he had collected to Taylor who forwarded it to Pietersburg.

When Morant's patrol, comprising mixed elements of B Squadron as most of his own troop was otherwise employed, returned to Fort Edward on the morning of 31 July, they brought with them 18 captured Boers, along with their women and children, 15 wagons, 30 rifles and 500 head of cattle. When he reported to Hunt, the squadron commander chastised Morant for bringing them in, and said that if he brought in any more he could feed them with his own rations. Woolmore asserts that Hunt was concerned about depleting his strength with guarding and escort duties, and the impost prisoners made on the limited food available. A day or two later, a BVC scouting patrol located eighteen Boers with twice that number of horses camped about 64 km (40 mi) away from Fort Edward, and a large patrol was sent out to engage them.

On 1 August a B Squadron patrol commanded by Picton captured two Boers on horseback about 9.7 km (6 mi) from the fort. The same patrol then set an ambush and subsequently captured seven wagons, two Cape carts, fourteen Boers, about seventeen rifles with ammunition, and about fifty women and children, along with some cattle. Picton's patrol then rode after a party of Boers led by a local farmer named Klopper. After stopping at the kraal of a local African chief, they obtained detailed intelligence about the party and caught them completely by surprise, capturing a further thirteen Boers along with many women and children. By this point Picton's patrol was 121 km (75 mi) from Fort Edward, and on 5 August they began a three-day trek back, slowed down by the wagons and cattle.

In the meantime, on 3 August, Lieutenant George Witton led twenty BVC reinforcements – including a replacement for Morrison, Sergeant Major Ernest Hammett – from Pietersburg to Fort Edward, and they were met a few miles from the fort by Lieutenant Hannam who guided them in. Upon arrival, Witton first met Morant and Handcock. Picton's patrol was still on its way back in, and Hunt had just left with seventeen men. During this first month at Fort Edward, Morant and Handcock were cruel to a captured monkey – tying it up and shooting at it – but Morant was also kind to Boer children held at Fort Edward prior to their departure for the Pietersburg concentration camp.

=== Attack at Duivelskloof and the death of Hunt ===
The detachment sent protect Reuter and his family on their return journey had then conducted a reconnaissance patrol to locate Viljoen's commando. At dawn on 30 July, BVC Trooper James Christie – a New Zealand farmer in his civilian life – had sent a messenger back to Fort Edward that a Boer laager had been located, with about twenty men with several wagons and carts and livestock to pull them. Information indicated that the laager was being used as a depot for supplies being transferred to a much larger laager in the nearby Modjadji mountains, where Viljoen was camped with between 80 and 100 of his men. It was in response to this information that Hunt had assembled fifteen BVC troops, and set out on the evening of 3 August. Hunt left Morant in command at Fort Edward, and took Eland with him, despite protests from Morant. The initial plan was to ride the 64 km (40 mi) due south to Buffelsberg where they would meet Christie, then attack the nearby laager under cover of dark. The force stopped at the Schiel farm, where Hunt arranged for Tony Schiel, one of Taylor's intelligence scouts, to accompany them. Shortly after leaving the Schiel farm, some African tribesmen informed Hunt's patrol that Viljoen was currently staying at the farmhouse of Wilem Viljoen in the Duivelskloof with a few men. Hunt immediately decided to ride to that location and attack, prioritising killing or capturing Viljoen over attacking the laager Christie's patrol had located. In order to strengthen his force, Hunt directed Eland to assemble a force of African tribesmen to assist. Given that Reuter's mission was only about 9.7 km (6 mi) from Viljoen's farm, the enhanced force then marched and rode through the night to the mission, arriving around 9 pm on 5 August. Upon arrival at Reuter's, the missionary was taken aback by Hunt's plan to attach the farmhouse, warning Hunt at length about the dangers of attacking the farmhouse, situated as it was in a rocky gully with only two ways in or out. Reuter also told Hunt that not only did Viljoen have fifteen men with him, but there were another forty men at the Botha farm a mere 6.4 km (4 mi) away, who would ride to cut them off as soon as they attacked the Viljoen farm. Hunt thanked Reuter for his assistance and advice, and the force left the mission about 11:30 pm. As they left, Hunt spoke to each of the four sergeants in his patrol, Eland, Gray, Oldham and Robinson, and told them that if he was shot, that they were to get out of the gully containing the Viljoen farmhouse before daylight.

In the very early hours of the following morning, Hunt's force dismounted about 1.6 km (1 mi) away from the Viljoen farmhouse and approached on foot. The building consisted of the living quarters in the centre with stables on either end. Hunt planned to approach the farmhouse, call out to the Boers inside that they were surrounded, and then if they did not do so, he would fire a shot, and Trooper Silke would send the fifty tribesmen forward to rush the farmhouse. In preparation, he sent Silke and his group along the road until they were about 46 m (50 yd) behind the farmhouse to await the signal. Another group of tribesmen accompany Schiel to a hill to the rear of the building. With Eland sticking close at his request, Hunt then brought the rest of the force within 200 yd (180 m), and approached the farmhouse himself, accompanied by Eland. Barend Viljoen and his men were aware of the approach of Hunt's force, having had scouts watching them for most of the previous day. The Boers were positioned in protected positions around the house and ordered to hold their fire until Viljoen opened fire. Unaware of these preparations, Hunt called on Viljoen to surrender, and firing broke out immediately. Most of the BVC troops immediately took cover, but Hunt ran forward, firing as he went, closely followed by Eland. In the ensuing firefight, Barend Viljoen, his brother Johannes, and another Boer were mortally wounded, and Hunt was about twenty paces from the door of the farmhouse when he was shot in the chest. Eland was also hit, shot through the hips and lower stomach. Silke attempted to send the tribesmen forward to attack, but they retreated instead.

According to the memoirs of Hendrik Adriaan Jacobs, the Viljoen Commando knew that an attack was coming. The members of the Commando, however, were "feverish" from the effects of malaria and fatalistically waited for the arrival of the Bushveldt Carbineers. Jacobs later recalled how he saw Hunt's party through a window and began shooting. Possibly mistaking Jacobs's first shot for the signal, the BVC and the Lobedu also began shooting and general pandemonium ensued. In an exchange of fire, Captain Hunt was shot through the chest. Sergeant Frank Eland was killed attempting to go to Hunt's aid, as was at least one Lobedu warrior. On the Boer side, Barend Viljoen, his brother J.J. Viljoen, and G. Hartzenberg were killed. The dead of both sides were left behind by their retreating comrades.

When the surviving members of the patrol returned to Medingen Mission Station, Rev. Reuter asked them about their officers and "was told a confusing and contradictory story of what had happened". Decades later, Rev. Reuter's daughter recalled in a televised interview, "My father roused on them, asking how they could leave their Captain like that."

The body of Captain Hunt was later found stripped, with his neck broken, his face stomped on with a hobnailed boot, and with his legs slashed with a knife.

According to Leach, however, Captain Hunt's broken neck would be consistent with a fall down the concrete steps after being wounded. The mutilations found on his body were also found on the bodies of the three dead Boers. Both sides blamed the other for the disfigurement of the dead. Hendrik Jacobs, however, believed that Lobedu witch-doctors were to blame. According to historian Charles Leach, accounts by French anthropologist Henri Junod reveal that the traditional practice of the Lobedu people was to disembowel dead and dying warriors on the battlefield to set their spirits free.

The body of Captain Percy Hunt was buried at the Medingen Mission Station, where a cross was later installed by the Commonwealth War Graves Commission. Sergeant Eland was buried at his family's homestead, the Ravenshill Farm, after a burial service was read by Rev. Reuter.

== Revenge killings ==
When news of Hunt's death reached the fort, Morant immediately ordered every available man out on patrol and broke down and cried while giving the news to the men. Captain Taylor then ordered the patrol to avenge the combat death of their captain and to, "Give no quarter".

Significantly, Morant did not see Hunt's body himself; according to Witton, Morant arrived about an hour after the burial. He questioned the men about Hunt's death and, convinced that he had been murdered in cold blood, he again vowed to take no prisoners. Witton alleges that Morant then declared that he had, on occasion, ignored Hunt's orders to this effect in the past, but that he would carry them out in the future.

=== Floris Visser ===
On the morning of 9 August 1901, Morant assigned a few men to guard the Mendingen Mission, which George Witton alleges the Boers had threatened to burn down in reprisal for Rev. Reuter's ties to the British.

This was true, according to South African historian Arthur Davey; Rev. Reuter, who had served with the Prussian Army during the recent war against France, had repeatedly displeased the Boer Commandos by violating the neutrality expected of missionaries. Even though the missionary had opposed their involvement, some of the Lobedu warriors who fought with Captain Hunt during the attack on the Viljoen Farm were converts to Lutheranism and members of Rev. Reuter's congregation. Furthermore, according to a letter from Bushveldt Carbineers officer Alfred Haserick to the mother of Sergeant Frank Eland, Rev. Reuter had supplied the ammunition used in the same attack. According to Davey, it should therefore come as no surprise that General Christian Frederick Beyers, the commanding officer of the Soutpansberg and Waterberg Commandos, had threatened Rev. Reuter with dire consequences if he continued to aid the British Army.

After leaving the Mendingen Mission, Lt. Morant led his men back to the Viljoen farmhouse. It had been abandoned, so they tracked the retreating Letaba Commando all day.

Morant continued, leading a patrol consisting of both members of the Bushveldt Carbineers and warriors from the local Lobedu people. That evening, after coming upon the Commando's encampment "outspanned in a gully", the patrol prepared to attack. Morant's Afrikaner adjutant, Trooper Theunis Botha, later recalled, "I may say here that for Morant's own cowardice the whole of the [Commando] party would have been caught as every other man in the patrol will testify. Instead of going close up as he could easily have done and so closing the cordon, he started firing at 2000 yards and would not go nearer."

Hearing the shots, the Viljoen Commando scattered. As his comrades fled, 20-year-old Floris Visser, who was unable to walk or ride, was left behind. The Bushveldt Carbineers found him lying under one of the wagons.

Trooper Botha later recalled, "I generally acted as interpreter for Lt Morant. On the evening on which Visser was captured, I acted in that capacity. I asked Visser by Lieutenant Morant's request how Capt. Hunt was killed. He replied that he was killed in a fair fight, shot through the chest. Lieutenant Morant said his neck was broken. Visser vehemently denied it. Before commencing to ask these questions, Lieutenant Morant said, 'If you tell the truth your life will be spared; if you tell lies you will be shot.' He then asked as to the plans of the Boers. Visser replied that the Boers did not intend to stay around there (Little Letaba) but were trekking to the Woodbush to join Beyers' Commando."

As the patrol continued their pursuit of the Letaba Commando, Visser was carried along. Trooper Botha continues: "In the morning similar questions were again asked him by Lieutenant Morant, who again promised to spare his life if he answered truthfully. Visser answered every question truthfully as subsequent events proved."

According to BVC Trooper Edward Powell, "After being captured he was conveyed in a cape cart about fifteen miles. When we outspanned, I heard that Lieutenants Morant, Handcock, and Picton would hold a court-martial and that Visser would probably be shot. Visser was in the cart all the time to the best of my belief and was not present at the court-martial."

According to Trooper Botha, "When [Henry] Ledeboer told Visser he was about to be shot, I heard Visser remind Lieutenant Morant through the interpreter that he had promised to spare his life if he had answered all his questions. Lieutenant Morant said, 'It is idle talk. We are going to shoot you,' or words to that effect."

According to Trooper James Christie, a New Zealander from Clutha on the South Island, when Morant ordered the patrol to form a firing squad, the men objected and one of the Lieutenants shouted, "If you're so damn chicken-hearted, I'll shoot him myself."

Before taking his place in the firing squad, Trooper Botha told Trooper Christie about Visser, "I know him good. I went to school with him. I don't like to do it, but they will shoot me if I don't."

The squad consisted of BVC Troopers A.J. Petrie, J.J. Gill, Wild, and T.J. Botha. Trooper Christie watched as the Lobedu lifted Visser out of the cape cart in a blanket and laid him down twenty yard away in a sitting position with his back to the firing squad.

Trooper Powell further alleged that the Lobedu danced "the war dance before Visser before he was shot".

A volley rang out and Visser fell backwards from his sitting position. A coup de grâce was delivered by BVC Lt. Harry Picton.

Lieutenant Morant then approached Trooper Christie and said, "I know it's hard times for him, but it's got to be done, see how the Boers knocked Captain Hunt about."

According to Trooper Christie, "I said that Captain Hunt had died a soldier's death—that he was killed in a 'fair go' and beyond being stripped, there was no maltreatment of him and how the Kaffirs might have stripped him. He said no; that Captain Hunt's tunic and trousers had been found in the Cape cart. 'But,' I said, 'the boy was not wearing them.' 'Anyhow,' he said, 'its got to be done. It's unfortunate that he should be the first to suffer.' I still held that it was not right to shoot him after carrying him for so far. But as up to this time Morant and I had been good friends, I said no more, but tore off my 'B.V.C.' badge and cursed such a form of soldiering. Then we saddled up and trekked for home."

On the orders of the officers, Visser was buried by the Lobedu in a shallow grave near Blas Perreira's Shop along the Koedoes River.

Even though Floris Visser had revealed information that placed his comrades at risk, his name was posthumously added to the Soutpansberg Commando's Roll of Honour.

On the return journey to the fort, Morant's unit stopped for the night at the store of a British trader, a Mr Hays, who was well known for his hospitality. After they left, Hays was raided by a party of Boers who looted everything he owned. When Morant and his men arrived back at Fort Edward, they learned that a convoy under Lieutenant Neel had arrived from Pietersburg the previous day, just in time to reinforce Captain Taylor against a strong Boer force that attacked the fort. During the encounter, one Carbineer was wounded and several horses were shot.

In a letter to Major Wilfred Bolton, Australian BVC Trooper R.M. Cochrane recalled the fallout from Visser's murder, "After the shooting of the wounded Boer, F. Visser, the faithful Kaffirs refused to reveal the whereabouts of their Boer masters. Presumably, they tended them themselves in the bush. One Kaffir, when commanded by Capt. Taylor to reveal the whereabouts of a wounded Boer, curtly replied, 'Kona', which was a direct refusal. Capt. Taylor shot him dead with his revolver."

Other killings followed.

=== The Eight Boers Case ===
On 20 August 1901, Captain Taylor received a report from his agent Henry Ledeboer, saying that eight Boer prisoners had surrendered to him and to BVC Trooper A.S. Petrie near the Swiss-run Elim Hospital. BVC Sergeant J.C. Wrench and a patrol of eight men were sent to intercept the party and to take charge of the prisoners. Before they left, Sgt. Wrench was reminded by BVC Corporal Albert van der Westhuizen, an Afrikaner "joiner", that Morant had ordered that no more prisoners were to be brought in, as the Troopers would then have to share their rations with them. After taking command of the prisoners, Sgt. Wrench and his patrol had made it as far as the Elim Hospital when they were met by Lts. Morant, Handcock, and Witton, along with Sgt.-Maj. Hammett and Troopers A.W.M. Thompson and A. Ducket.

Lt. Morant ordered Sgt. Wrench and his patrol to return to Fort Edward as an advance guard.

Lt. Morant told Sgt. Wrench's patrol to ride on about a mile ahead. Morant also said, "If you hear shots in front of you gallop back to the wagon."

According to BVC Trooper Albert van der Westhuizen, "He told us to scout as we went along as a large number of Boers were close at hand. We did not scout, as we knew this all to be moonshine."

As they stopped at Elim Hospital, the Troopers were noticed by Rev. Carl August Daniel Heese of the Berlin Missionary Society's Station at Potgietersrus.

At the request of a senior Australian Intelligence Officer named Captain Frederick de Bertodano, Rev. Heese and his driver, a member of the Southern Ndebele people, had travelled from Potgietersrus in to bring Mr. Craig, a British shopkeeper and Army Intelligence Scout, to be treated at the Elim Hospital. But as Rev. Heese and his driver began their journey back home to Potgietersrus, the missionary recognized one of his friends among the eight prisoners.

Only four of the eight prisoners were Afrikaners. The rest were Dutch schoolteachers who had come to the Northern Transvaal on a teaching contract funded in Amsterdam. One of them was W.D. Vahrmeijer, the former head teacher at the Emmanuel School in Potgietersrus.

In a letter to the Berlin Missionary Society, Rev. Heese's wife Johanna wrote, "As he turned a corner he saw a wagon with 8 Boers who had surrendered—that is given up their arms, and they were now, as they thought, to be taken to some sort of camp. They were guarded by Lieutenants [Morant] and Handcock of the Sweetwaters Camp and some Australian soldiers who were lying in the grass. Rev. Daniel Hesse recognized one of the prisoners as the head schoolmaster of our village, an extremely nice Dutchman named [Vahrmeijer]... Daniel went straight up and spoke to him. The schoolmaster said that he and the other prisoners were very uneasy as to their ultimate fate, although they had surrendered voluntarily. Daniel comforted them by telling them that nothing could happen to them. The guards became angry with Daniel for speaking to the prisoners, and ordered him to get up onto the wagon and consider himself also a prisoner. Daniel refused, saying that they might have prevented him from approaching the prisoners, that he was in possession of a pass from the commander at Pietersburg allowing him to travel freely, and promised to report himself at the camp and bring his passport with him. The prisoners were then removed..."

Trooper van der Westhuizen later recalled, "We rode leisurely along the road. We travelled about three-quarters of a mile when we heard three shots which were fired by Messes Ledeboer and Schwartz of the Intelligence attached to the BVC. We met them with their rifles so we knew they fired the shots. These shots were fired in accordance with a pre-arranged plan in order to simulate a Boer attack. Immediately we heard those three signal shots in front, we heard the volley fired to our rear and we knew the prisoners were being shot... After hearing the shots we rode on. By Sweetwaters Farm we met Capt. Taylor. He asked Sergt. Wrench if he heard any shots. Sergt. Wrench for private reasons said, 'No,' as he did not know what Capt Taylor would do if he said he had heard them. Capt. Taylor said, 'All right, go the fort and get off saddle.'"

The known names of the victims were C.P.J. Smit, M. Logenaar, M. Baaukens, W.D. Vahrmeijer, G.K. Westerhof, B. Wouters, and J.J. Du Preez.

In his memoir Scapegoats of the Empire, Lt. George Witton alleges that one of the eight victims, "a big powerful Dutchman", lunged at him moments before the firing squad started shooting. He claims to have been told by Henry Ledeboer after shooting the Dutchman that the man who lunged at him was "a most notorious scoundrel" and "the head of a band of marauders". The bodies of all eight victims were then buried in a mass grave.

According to South African historian Charles Leach, the man who lunged at Lt. Witton was Carl P.J. Smit, who was in reality a Deacon at his Dutch Reformed parish. In a signed deposition, Trooper van der Westhuizen said that he believed that the only reason why Carl Smit had been included with the other prisoners was that Henry Ledeboer's father-in-law, Monty Ash, owed Smit the sum of £130.

Although the Bushveldt Carbineers later alleged that all eight victims were Commando members, in reality, only five of them, Westerhof, Smit, Logenaar, Du Preez, and Pauskie were added to the Soutpansberg Commando's Roll of Honour.

=== Rev. Daniel Heese ===
About a week later, reports began to circulate that Reverend Heese had been found shot along the Pietersburg road about 15 miles (24 km) from the fort on his way to Pietersburg to report the activities of Morant and his group to the British authorities.

Captain de Bertodano later wrote, "To my great surprise, about the last week of August 1901, I received a wire from McWilliams to say that the Mission Station at P.P. Rust urgently required the return of the Rev. Heese. I immediately wired from H.Q. to Fort Edward asking for a full explanation as to why Mr. Heese had been detained for several weeks. The reply made some excuse for this, and said that he was leaving the next day, about 26th or 27th of August. About the 29th August a further wire came to say that the Reverend Heese had been shot by Boers near Bandolier Koopjes, 15 miles from Fort Edward on the Pietersburg Road. That a Predicant (or Missionary) had been shot by Boers was a yarn I could not swallow!"

As, "rumours had been seeping in to Pietersburg of the behaviour of the Carbineers", Captain de Bertodano decided to begin an investigation. He later recalled, however, "We could get no further information from Fort Edward about this affair, as the telegraph line was out of order! It always was when it suited Fort Edward not to communicate."

In response, Captain de Bertodano dispatched, "two splendid native scouts", to secretly travel to Fort Edward and question the Black South African boys who worked as servants to the Bushveldt Carbineers and to Captain Taylor's staff. Nine days later, one of the scouts returned alone and brought back information about the murders of Boer POWs and the assassination of Rev. Heese. The latter killing had been committed, according to the boys at Fort Edward, by Lieut. Peter Handcock under orders from Morant.

Reverend Krause, the Berlin Missionary Society's Superintendent in Pietersburg, was just as skeptical of the official explanation as Captain de Bertodano. As a result, Reverend Krause secretly summoned Pastors Sonntag and Endelmann, arranged for them to receive passes, and sent them to the Bandolierkop area to investigate.

The Reports of November 1901 of the Mission Head Office in Berlin later announced, "Their investigation lasted from 8–11 September 1901. They found the grave and marked it with stones and a wooden cross, so that later, when the roads were once again open to free travel, they would be able to find the body again for re-burial at the Makapaanspoort Mission Station. In the same way, they also found the body of the Black servant. He had not yet been buried. So they buried him at the same place where they found him—he was a heathen, Ndebele from Chief Hans Mapala's location in Malapong. Otherwise, they could find nothing new that could clarify the murder and the reason for this terrible deed."

The society later wrote in Missionhaus Berlin, "On 30 October the burial of the murdered missionary Heese Jnr. took place at the Swiss Mission Station Elim. Two days previously, his body had been exhumed at the scene of his murder by English soldiers in the presence of the Missionary Gottschling and placed in a coffin lined with tin and taken to Elim. Apart from the Swiss brothers there were several of our missionaries present. On 30 October at 10 AM, ceremonial burial took place. The Swiss missionary, De Meuron, conducted the service. Missionary Gottschling told the life story of the deceased. The missionaries, accompanied by their Swiss brothers and sisters sang funeral songs. An abundance of wreaths came from far and wide. The officers of the English troops in the vicinity also attended the service."

According to South African historian Charles Leach, "Several eminent South African historians, local enthusiasts and commentators share the opinion that had it not been for the murder of the Reverend Heese, none of the other Bushveldt Carbineers murders would have gone to trial."

=== The Three Boers Case ===
Soon afterwards, acting on a report that three armed Boer commandos were travelling to the fort, Morant took Handcock and several other men to intercept them. After the Boers surrendered with a white flag, they were taken prisoner, disarmed and shot.

Later the same day, Major Lenehan arrived at Fort Edward for a rare visit.

Morant persuaded Lenehan to let him command a strong patrol out to search for a small Boer unit commanded by Field-cornet Kelly, an Irish-Boer commando whose farm was in the district. Kelly had fought against the British in the main actions of the war, and after returning to his home he had become a commando rather than surrender.

Morant's patrol left Fort Edward on 16 September 1901 with orders from Lenehan that Kelly and his men were to be captured and brought back alive if possible. Covering 130 miles (210 km) in a week of hard riding, they left their horses 2 miles (3.2 km) from Kelly's laager and went the rest of the way on foot. During the early hours of the next morning, Morant's patrol charged the laager, this time taking the Boers completely by surprise; Morant himself arrested Kelly at gunpoint at the door of his tent. A week later, they returned to Fort Edward with the Kelly party and then escorted them safely to Pietersburg. The British commandant, Colonel Hall, sent Morant a message congratulating him on the success of his mission, after which Morant took two weeks' leave.

=== The letter ===
On 4 October 1901, a letter signed by 15 members of the Bushveldt Carbineers (BVC) garrison at Fort Edward was dispatched secretly to Col. F.H. Hall, the British Army Officer Commanding at Pietersburg. Written by BVC Trooper Robert Mitchell Cochrane, a former Justice of the Peace from Western Australia, the letter accused members of the Fort Edward garrison of six "disgraceful incidents":

1. The shooting of six surrendered Afrikaner men and boys and the theft of their money and livestock at Valdezia on 2 July 1901. The orders had been given by Captains Alfred Taylor and James Huntley Robertson, and relayed by Sgt. Maj. K. C. B. Morrison to Sgt. D. C. Oldham. The actual killing was alleged to have been done by Sgt. Oldham and BVC Troopers Eden, Arnold, Brown, Heath, and Dale.
2. The shooting of BVC Trooper B. J. van Buuren by BVC Lt. Peter Handcock on 4 July 1901. Trooper van Buuren, an Afrikaner, had "disapproved" of the killings at Valdezia, and had informed the victims' wives and children, who were imprisoned at Fort Edward, of what had happened.
3. The revenge killing of Floris Visser, a wounded prisoner of war, near the Koedoes River on 11 August 1901. Visser had been captured by a BVC patrol led by Lieut. Morant two days before his death. After Visser had been exhaustively interrogated and conveyed for 15 miles by the patrol, Lt Morant had ordered his men to form a firing squad and shoot him. The squad consisted of BVC Troopers A. J. Petrie, J. J. Gill, Witton, and T. J. Botha. A coup de grâce was delivered by BVC Lt Harry Picton. The slaying of Floris Visser was in retaliation for the combat death of Morant's close friend, BVC Captain Percy Frederik Hunt, at Duivelskloof on 6 August 1901.
4. The shooting, ordered by Capt. Taylor and Lt. Morant, of four surrendered Afrikaners and four Dutch schoolteachers, who had been captured at the Elim Hospital in Valdezia, on the morning of 23 August 1901. The firing squad consisted of BVC Lt. George Witton, Sgt. D.bC. Oldham, and Troopers J. T. Arnold, Edward Brown, T. Dale, and A. Heath. Although Trooper Cochrane's letter made no mention of the fact, three Native South African witnesses were also shot dead.
  The ambush and fatal shooting of the Reverend Carl August Daniel Heese of the Berlin Missionary Society near Bandolierkop on the afternoon of 23 August 1901. Rev. Heese had spiritually counselled the Dutch and Afrikaner victims that morning and had angrily protested to Lt Morant at Fort Edward upon learning of their deaths. Trooper Cochrane alleged that the killer of Rev. Heese was BVC Lt Peter Handcock. Although Cochrane made no mention of the fact, Rev. Heese's driver, a member of the Southern Ndebele people, was also killed.
5. The orders, given by BVC Lt Charles H. G. Hannam, to shoot at a wagon train containing Afrikaner women and children who were coming in to surrender at Fort Edward, on 5 September 1901. The ensuing gunfire caused the deaths of two boys, aged five and 13 years, and the wounding of a 9-year-old girl.
6. The shooting of Roelf van Staden and his sons Roelf and Christiaan, near Fort Edward on 7 September 1901. All were coming in to surrender in the hope of gaining medical treatment for teenaged Christiaan, who was suffering from recurring bouts of fever. Instead, they were met at the Sweetwaters Farm near Fort Edward by a party consisting of Lts. Morant and Handcock, joined by BVC Sgt. Maj. Hammet, Corp. MacMahon, and Troopers Hodds, Botha, and Thompson. Roelf van Staden and both his sons were then shot, allegedly after being forced to dig their own graves.

The letter then accused the Field Commander of the BVC, Major Robert Lenahan, of being "privy to these misdeamenours. It is for this reason that we have taken the liberty of addressing this communication direct to you." After listing numerous civilian witnesses who could confirm their allegations, Trooper Cochrane concluded, "Sir, many of us are Australians who have fought throughout nearly the whole war while others are Africaners who have fought from Colenso till now. We cannot return home with the stigma of these crimes attached to our names. Therefore we humbly pray that a full and exhaustive inquiry be made by Imperial officers in order that the truth be elicited and justice done. Also we beg that all witnesses may be kept in camp at Pietersburg till the inquiry is finished. So deeply do we deplore the opprobrium which must be inseparably attached to these crimes that scarcely a man once his time is up can be prevailed to reenlist in this corps. Trusting for the credit of thinking you will grant the inquiry we seek."

=== Arrest ===
In response to the letter written by Trooper Cochrane, Colonel Hall summoned all Fort Edward officers and noncommissioned officers to Pietersburg on 21 October 1901. All were met by a party of mounted infantry five miles (8 km) outside Pietersburg on the morning of 23 October 1901 and "brought into town like criminals". Morant was arrested after returning from leave in Pretoria.

Captain de Bertodano later recalled, "One afternoon walking through the Camp, I met Morant out for exercise with a young Lieut. of the Wiltshire Regiment (dark red hair, but whose name I forget)... Morant came up to me and said that his trial for the shooting of the Missionary was a scandal and a disgrace to the Army, that he was innocent, and that he was selected as a victim because he had shot a few damned Boers. 'You are the man who has worked up all the evidence and you ought to be ashamed of yourself for the betrayal of your brother officers.' I replied very quietly, 'Morant, I am very proud of having been the cause of bringing you to trial. You know in your heart that you and Handcock murdered poor old Heese because you were afraid that he would report the shooting of the Boers in cold blood. But you were such damned fools as not to realise that we had all the evidence without calling on him. We know who is behind it all and has led you by the nose, but we haven't got him yet... I don't recognize you and that poor fool Handcock as brother officers. You are guilty as Hell and I am glad to help send you there.... Where is your boy? He has disappeared. Have you murdered him, too?' I told the young officer that his prisoner was not allowed to speak to anyone and walked away."

=== Indictments ===
The trial transcripts, like all others dating from between 1850 and 1914 but one, were later "destroyed under statute" by the Civil Service. South African historian Arthur Davey, however, considers it far more likely that all the transcripts from those years were "destroyed by the Luftwaffe" during The Blitz. It is known, however, that a Court of Inquiry, the British military's equivalent to a grand jury, was convened on 16 October 1901. The president of the court was Col. H.M. Carter, who was assisted by Captain E. Evans and Major Wilfred N. Bolton, the Provost Marshal of Pietersburg. The first session of the court occurred on 6 November 1901 and continued for four weeks. Deliberations continued for further two weeks, at which time it became known that the indictments would be as follows:

1. In what became known as "The Six Boers Case", Captains Robertson and Taylor, as well as Sgt. Maj. Morrison, were charged with committing the offence of murder while on active service.
2. In relation to what was dubbed "The Van Buuren Incident", Lieut. Handcock was charged with murder and Maj. Lenehan was charged as follows: "When on active service by culpable neglect failing to make a report which it was his duty to make."
3. In relation to "The Visser Incident", Lts. Morant, Handcock, Witton, and Picton were charged with "While on active service committing the offence of murder."
4. In relation to what was incorrectly dubbed "The Eight Boers Case", Lieuts. Morant, Handcock, and Witton were charged with, "While on active service committing the offence of murder."
5. In relation to the slaying of Rev Heese, Lts. Morant and Handcock were charged with, "While on active service committing the offence of murder."
6. No charges were filed for the three children who had been shot by the Bushveldt Carbineers near Fort Edward.
7. In relation to what became known as "The Three Boers Case", Lts. Morant and Handcock were charged with, "While on active service committing the offence of murder."

In a confidential report to the War Office, Col. J. St. Claire wrote,

I agree generally with the views expressed by the Court of Inquiry in the opinions of the several cases. The idea that no prisoners were to be taken in the Spelonken area appears to have been started by the late Captain Hunt & after his death continued by orders given personally by Captain Taylor.

The statement that Captain Hunt's body had been maltreated is in no way corroborated & the reprisals undertaken by Lt Morant on this idea were utterly unjustifiable.

Lieut Morant seems to have been the primary mover in carrying out these orders, & Lieut Handcock willingly lent himself out as the principle executioner of them.

Lieut Morant acquiesced in the illegal execution of the wounded Boer Visser & took a personal part in the massacre of the 8 surrendered Boers on 23 August.

The two N.C.O.s acted under orders but were not justified in obeying illegal commands. After the murder of Van Buuren, the officers seem to have exercised a reign of terror in the District, which hindered their men from reporting their illegal acts & even prevented their objecting to assist in the crime.

== Court-martial ==
The court-martial of Morant and his co-accused began on 16 January 1902 and was conducted in several stages. Two main hearings were conducted at Pietersburg in relatively relaxed conditions; one concerned the shooting of Visser, the other the "Eight Boers" case. A large number of depositions by members of the BVC were made, giving damning evidence against the accused.

Soon after the second hearing, the prisoners were put in irons, taken to Pretoria while heavily guarded, and tried on the third main count, that of killing Reverend Heese. Although acquitted of killing Reverend Heese, Morant and his co-accused were quickly sentenced to death on the other two charges. Morant and Handcock were shot 18 hours after sentencing, while Witton's sentence was commuted to life imprisonment by Lord Kitchener. Kitchener personally signed Morant's and Handcock's death warrants. The Field Marshal was absent on tour when the executions occurred.

== Personal life ==
Morant claimed, at a Court of Enquiry in South Africa, to have become engaged to a woman in Devonshire, England, with Captain Percy Frederick Hunt becoming engaged to her sister. In 2020, it was revealed through the discovery of four different marriage certificates that Hunt had personally signed, that Morant's claims about his trip to England with Hunt were false. Hunt had actually been in Pretoria during Morant's given timeline of these events, acting as a marriage commissioner.

== Execution ==
On 25 February 1902, Ex-Captain Robertson was sent to personally collect Morant's and Handcock's death warrants from Lord Kitchener, whose Melrose House Headquarters was very close to Pretoria Prison. According to Robertson, Kitchener signed both death warrants in front of him. As Kitchener handed the documents over, the Commander in Chief glared at the disgraced captain and said, "Think yourself lucky that you're not amongst them.

A frantic Major Thomas desperately tried to appeal to Lord Kitchener, but was informed by Major General W. F. Kelly that the Commander-in-Chief was not expected back for several days. Thomas pleaded with Kelly to have the executions stayed until he could appeal to King Edward VII, but the General replied that the sentences had already been referred to England – and confirmed.

According to Charles Leach,

The impact of the sentences was stunning. The Lieutenants requested writing materials, after which letters were immediately written to Kitchener, to family members in Australia, and to the Australian Government. Telegrams were also sent. Some of this mail apparently never even left Pretoria, whilst certain letters did arrive at their destinations.

When asked if he wanted to see a clergyman, Morant replied indignantly, "No! I'm a Pagan!" On hearing this, Handcock asked, "What's a Pagan?" and after hearing the explanation, declared, "I'm a Pagan too!"

According to Charles Leach, however, "This is contradictory to the Pretoria Prison Admission Register, where they both indicated their membership in Christian churches: Morant as Ch. of E. [Church of England] and Handcock as R.C. [Roman Catholic]."

As the afternoon wore on, all the prisoners could clearly hear the sound of coffins being built in the nearby workshop. At 16:00 hours, Witton was told he would be leaving for England at five o'clock the next morning.

Captain de Bertodano later wrote,

The BVC had been abolished. The commanding officer, Major Lenehan, had been sent to Pretoria: Witton says he was under arrest, but I doubt this. A day or two after my return to Pretoria, to my surprise Lenehan sent in his name. He had come, he said, to complain bitterly about the indignity put upon three of his officers in that they had been sent to Pretoria in handcuffs. I looked at him and said, 'You are speaking of three men convicted of murder; they are not officers.' He was taken aback and made no reply and left the office. I never saw him again. He [Lenehan] was taken to Cape Town, under escort I believe, and shipped to Australia on the first available steamer.

That night, Morant, Picton, Handcock and Witton had a last supper together; at Morant's request, he and Handcock were allowed to spend their last night in the same cell. Morant spent most of the night writing and then penned a final sardonic verse, which he titled, Butchered to Make a Dutchmen's Holiday.

Morant also wrote a confession which read

To the Rev. Canon Fisher
Pretoria
The night before we're shot
We shot the Boers who killed and mutilated
our friend (the best mate I had on Earth)
Harry Harbord Morant
Peter Joseph Handcock

At 05:00 hours on 27 February, Witton was taken away and was allowed to say a brief farewell to Morant and Handcock, but was only allowed to see them through the small gate in the cell door and clasped hands.

Shortly before 06:00 hours, Morant and Handcock were led out of the fort at Pretoria to be executed by a firing squad from the Queen's Own Cameron Highlanders. Both men refused to be blindfolded; Morant gave his cigarette case to the squad leader. His last words were reported as: "Shoot straight, you bastards! Don't make a mess of it!" A contemporary report from The Argus on 3 April 1902, however, has his last words as "Take this thing (the blindfold) off", and on its removal, "Be sure and make a good job of it!" Witton wrote that he was by then at Pretoria railway station and heard the volley of shots that killed his comrades. However, Robert Poore, who attended the execution, wrote in his diary that he put Witton and Lieutenant Picton on the train that left at 05:30 hours. Thus, Witton would have been several miles on the way to Cape Town when the execution occurred.

== Legacy ==
The newly federated Australian government demanded an explanation from Kitchener who, on 5 April 1902, sent a telegram to the Australian Governor-General, which was published in its entirety in the Australian press. It reads as follows:

In reply to your telegram, Morant, Handcock and Witton were charged with twenty separate murders, including one of a German missionary who had witnessed other murders. Twelve of these murders were proved. From the evidence it appears that Morant was the originator of these crimes which Handcock carried out in cold-blooded manner. The murders were committed in the wildest parts of the Transvaal, known as Spelonken, about eighty miles north of Pretoria, on four separate dates namely 2 July, 11 August, 23 August, and 7 September. In one case, where eight Boer prisoners were murdered, it was alleged to have been done in a spirit of revenge for the ill treatment of one of their officers – Captain Hunt – who was killed in action. No such ill-treatment was proved. The prisoners were convicted after a most exhaustive trial, and were defended by counsel. There were, in my opinion, no extenuating circumstances. Lieutenant Witton was also convicted but I commuted the sentence to penal servitude for life, in consideration of his having been under the influence of Morant and Handcock. The proceedings have been sent home.

During 1981, South African historian Dr. C.A.R. Schulenburg wrote to the Public Record Office and was informed by letter that the trial transcripts, like almost all others dating from between 1850 and 1914, had "been destroyed under statute" by the Civil Service between 1923 and 1958.

George Witton was transported to naval detention quarters in England and then to HM Prison Lewes in Sussex. Some time later, he was transferred to HM Prison The Verne in Portland, Dorset, and was released after serving twenty-eight months. His release was announced before the British House of Commons on 10 August 1904. On his release he returned to Australia and for a while lived in Lancefield, Victoria, where he wrote his controversial "memoir" of the Court-martial of Breaker Morant. He published it during 1907 with the provocative title Scapegoats of the Empire.

Captain de Bertodano later denounced Witton's account, saying, "It is mostly a garbled and untrue version of the facts." The Captain added, however, that, "When the book was published, it was largely bought up by the Govt. as a false presentation of what occurred."

Australian historian Craig Wilcox is equally critical. After expressing disgust that Australian law in 1907 could, "allow a murderer to make money from his story", Wilcox continued, "George Witton's Scapegoats of the Empire promised to tell the truth about a war crime. Instead the book offered a half-truth, one that painted the perpetrators as the victims and the judges as the villains. The half-truth was what many Australians wanted to hear and Witton's book became a rotten prop for a bogus legend that would help Australia win a cultural war of independence."

In 1929, George Witton revealed in a letter to James Francis Thomas that Peter Handcock had confessed to murdering Rev. Daniel Heese on Morant's orders shortly after they were both acquitted in 1902. At the time, Maj. Thomas was still unable to forgive himself for having failed to save Morant and Handcock's lives and had continued battling for decades to prove his clients innocence and to keep the case in the public eye. Upon receiving Witton's letter and realizing the degree to which his deceased clients had manipulated him, Maj. Thomas was, by all accounts, completely beside himself.

George Witton had a heart attack while cranking his car engine, and died in hospital on 14 August 1942, at the age of 68. He lies buried with his first wife Mary Witton in Brisbane's Lutwyche Cemetery.

Alfred Taylor returned to his farm near Plumtree, in Southern Rhodesia. He died of cholecystitis and pneumonia at Bulawayo Memorial Hospital on 24 October 1941. On 31 October 1941, a brief obituary in the Rhodesian Herald described Taylor as one of Rhodesia's "pioneers".

According to South African historian Arthur Davey, "If Taylor enriched himself through the acquisition of Boer cattle, his lasting prosperity was not ensured by it. The National Archives, Harare, has correspondence that points to his having sought financial assistance from the Government later in his life. When he died in 1941 the estate that he left was not that of a wealthy farmer."

Intelligence Scout Henry Ledeboer was never prosecuted for the revenge killings in which he had assisted. He became in later life a well known game ranger at Kruger National Park.

According to Charles Leach, "After the war, Major Wilfred N. Bolton, 2nd Wilts and Provost Marshal of Pietersburg, relinquished his military appointment to become a civilian magistrate. He became Resident Magistrate in Pietersburg and, as such, became involved with some of the descendants of the Bushveldt Carbineers victims. He was deeply committed to the cause of justice by way of compensation for the families of those victims and he soon became well known in the town and surrounding district. The proceeding and handling of the claims involved an exhausting amount of correspondence and bureaucratic dealing with numerous military as well as governmental departments and offices, most of which were located in London. Bolton became admired for his dedication, compassion, and perseverance in that lengthy process that dragged on until 1909 and beyond."

Despite Morant and Handcock's acquittal for the murder of Reverend Heese, the missionary's widow, Johanna Heese, received £5000 from the War Office.

According to Charles Leach, "The British military authorities granted compensation to Mrs. Heese for the death of her husband despite the court finding Handcock not guilty. Surely this is also an 'admission' that the killer was a British soldier? That Handcock was found not guilty by the court for the shooting of both Reverend Heese and his driver was perhaps due to a proper, professional investigation into the murder. The finding of not guilty will never in itself absolve him of suspicion."

Mrs. Pieternella Jacoba Vahrmeijer, whose school teacher husband had been murdered under Morant's orders in the Eight Boers Case, received a £100 down payment followed by another £50 per year.

Mrs. Carel Smit, whose church deacon husband had also been murdered in the Eight Boers Case, received £100, plus an additional £100 for each of her children.

The two daughters of Roelf van Staden, whose father and two brothers had been murdered in the Three Boers Case, received £200 each.

Leach also writes, "After the war, the total number of identified White victims of the Bushveldt Carbineers and the British Army's Intelligence Department was pegged at 22. Local research has subsequently revealed at least 36 known victims, both Black and White."

Even so, the Australian government was so resentful over the executions of Morant and Handcock that they insisted that no Australian soldiers be court-martialled by the British military during World War I. This change in policy is partly credited for no Australian deserters being executed during the First World War.

The graves of Morant and Handcock were left unattended for many years, but after the release of Bruce Beresford's movie it became a popular place of pilgrimage for Australian tourists. During June 1998, the Australian Government spent $1,500 refurbishing the gravesite with a new concrete slab. The marble cross which stood over the grave had been vandalised, as had many other gravestones nearby.

The South African Government also erected a series of monuments to mark the locations of some of the incidents, including that of the nighttime battle at Duivelskloof, and the site of the mass grave of the four Afrikaners and four Dutch schoolteachers who were shot on Lt. Morant's orders during "The Eight Boers Case".

According to historian Charles Leach, "During the 2002 Anglo-Boer War Centenary Celebrations, an extremely well planned and presented reenactment of the Court-Martial was produced in Pietersburg. The organizing committee comprising a team of historians and enthusiasts was headed by Prof. Louis Changuinon. Many descendants of the actual victims were present at the 'hearing', which took place at the Pietersburg Club, a block away from the house where the actual trial was held. At that part of the hearing when witnesses were called to testify in the Heese case, an element of surprise occurred when Prof. Malie Smuts, granddaughter of Reverend Heese stepped forward and presented items that had been recovered from her grandfather's cart by the British military and returned to the Heese family after the war. These items were a small shotgun, a Bible, and a fob watch."

== Literature on Morant and conflicting theories about the case ==
Morant's life, exploits, trial and execution have been examined in several books and numerous press and internet articles, but as noted above, each account varies very considerably from the others in both the facts presented and their interpretation. There are facts intermingled with fiction.

The most important primary source, the official record of the court-martial, vanished after the trial, and its location remains a mystery. A report on the case from Kitchener to the Australian Governor-General (published in the Australian press on 7 April 1902) quotes Kitchener as saying that "the proceedings have been sent home" [i.e. to England]. Whatever their actual fate, the transcripts have not been seen since the trial and evidently not even the Australian government was granted access to them.

In the 'Afterword' to the 1982 reprint of Witton's book, G.A. Embleton states that:

... the British authorities have been approached by many researchers eager to examine the transcripts thought to be held by the War Office. Invariably these requests have been met with denials that the documents exist or pronouncements to the effect that they cannot be released until the year 2002 ... It now appears that the papers never reached England ... (it was) recently announced that the court-martial papers had been discovered in South Africa ...

A comprehensive record of the trial of Morant and Handcock, complete with a large number of depositions by members of the BVC and other witnesses of the deeds of Morant and Handcock, appears in Arthur Davey's publication, Breaker Morant and the Bushveldt Carbineers.

During 2012, South African historian Charles Leach published the book The Legend of Breaker Morant is DEAD and BURIED: A South African version of the Bushveldt Carbineers in the Zoutpansberg, May 1901 – April 1902. Based upon extensive research, Leach had complete access to unpublished South African sources and the papers of the Viljoen and Heese families.

Joe West, a British Bushveldt Carbineers researcher, wrote in response: "Charles Leach's impressive research has revealed that the crimes of Morant and his associates were worse than originally thought. In today's day and age Morant and Handcock plus several others would be arraigned before a War Crime Tribunal."

=== Primary sources ===
In the absence of the original trial records, three primary sources remain. The first is the report of the trial printed in The Times during April 1902; the second is George Witton's account of the events of 1901–02, contained in his book Scapegoats of the Empire. The third is a letter about the case, written by Witton to Major Thomas during 1929, which was kept secret at Witton's request until 1970. In it, Witton suggests that although Handcock confessed to the crimes, he did so under duress.

More recently in 2004, a diary written by Robert Poore, the provost marshal at the time, was unearthed with a record for 7 October 1901. It reads:

The Bushveldt Carbineers accepted the surrender of 8 Boers and after taking them along for some time shot them. If they had intended doing this they should not have accepted a surrender in the first instance. A German missionary was close by and so as to prevent him saying anything they shot him too. I just gave the outline of the case to lord K but it is a bad one.

— Robert Poore,

Different commentators have taken the diary entry either to mean that an order to take no prisoners did exist, exonerating Morant and Handcock, or that they had clearly acted wrongly by accepting a surrender from the Boers but then shooting them.

=== Other accounts ===
Wilcox, in Australia's Boer war: the war in South Africa 1899–1902, states the next important book in creating the Morant myth was Cutlack's Breaker Morant (1962), a short book as much a cartoon version of reality as The Bulletin once presented. Cutlack's story, said Wilcox, was based on Witton's Scapegoats and Frank Fox's Breaker Morant.

The 1976 book The Australians at the Boer War by Australian writer R. L. Wallace gives a concise and reasonably detailed account of Morant's military career, trial and execution although it contains almost no information about Morant's earlier life and omits a number of significant details contained in Witton's account of the events resulting in Morant's trial. However, Wallace was writing an overall account of the Australians' role in South Africa, not the life of Morant, Handcock or Witton.

The most widely known book is the best-selling Australian novel The Breaker by Kit Denton, first published in 1973 and inspired by Denton's meeting and conversation with a Boer War veteran who had known Morant. Wilcox suggested this book is a follow-on from Cutlack's book and helped establish the myth. However, Denton claimed that Morant and Handcock were executed in Pietersburg and buried near that spot. This mistake appeared in his book as late as 1981, and is a possible explanation as to why there is confusion about the location of the execution, i.e., Pretoria or Pietersburg.

Kenneth Ross's 1978 successful and widely acclaimed play Breaker Morant: A Play in Two Acts, was adapted by Ross and Bruce Beresford into Beresford's 1980 movie Breaker Morant. The movie was nominated for the 1980 Academy Award for a screenplay adapted from another source.

=== Legacy ===
Although it is generally accepted that Morant and/or others in his regiment were responsible for the deaths of a number of Boer commandos, historical opinion is still divided over the main questions of the case – how many Boers were killed, by whom were they killed, and on whose orders? In his book, Born to Fight, Neil Speed has photos of a number of Canadian Scouts wearing black feathers (pp. 105 & 119), a symbol that they would shoot any armed Boer they captured.

Morant's devotees, however, argue that he and Handcock were unfairly singled out for punishment even though many other British soldiers were known to have committed summary executions of Boer prisoners. In their opinion, the two Australians were made scapegoats by the British, who were intent on concealing the existence of the "take no prisoners" policy against Boer insurgents – a policy which, they claim, had been promulgated by Kitchener himself.

However, Hamish Paterson, a South African military historian and a member of the Military History Society, has emphasised that the Bushveldt Carbineers were a British Imperial unit, not an Australian one: technically, the two "Aussies" were British officers.

A 2002 book by Nick Bleszynski, "Shoot Straight, You Bastards": The True Story Behind The Killing of 'Breaker' Morant, promoted the "scapegoat" argument. It said that while Morant and the others probably committed some crimes and may well have deserved disciplinary action, there is now persuasive evidence from several sources to show that the Kitchener 'no prisoners' order did indeed exist, that it was widely known among both the British and Australian troops and was performed by many disparate units. It also asserted that the court-martial's procedures were flawed.

According to South African historian Arthur Davey,

Hunt was only 28 when he was killed and therefore younger than his subordinates, Morant and Handcock, and only a year older than the hapless Witton. His tenure as a junior officer in the regular army had been short and it can be supposed that his knowledge of military law was limited. At the courts-martial several witnesses, Sergeant S. Robertson and Lieutenants Morant, Handcock, and Picton mentioned that Hunt had given orders that no prisoners should be taken. Ex-Captain Robertson, giving evidence at the trial of Lenehan, stated that he, Taylor, and Hunt had known the truth about the death of Trooper van Buuren which had been concealed 'in the interest of the corps.' As the Heese case shows, the veracity of Morant and Handcock is suspect, whilst Captain Robertson was a man who had turned King's Evidence, so Hunt's reputation remains, as it were, in limbo.

== Petition ==
During 2002, a group of Australians travelled to South Africa and held a service at the Pretoria graveside to commemorate the execution on the morning of its hundredth anniversary. The service was also attended by the Australian High Commissioner to South Africa. The group left a new marker on the grave.

A petition to pardon Morant and Handcock was sent to Queen Elizabeth II during February 2010. The petition has been severely criticised in South Africa, specifically by descendants of the Viljoen brothers who were killed in the skirmish with Hunt and Eland and by the descendants of the family of Rev. Heese.

Hamish Paterson states: "I don’t think they [the Australian supporters of a Morant pardon] have actually considered what Morant was convicted of. Let's start off with the laws of war. If for example, we have a surrender. You want to surrender and I don’t accept your surrender, so I choose not to accept it, that I’m entitled to do. [...] However, the situation changes dramatically once I accept your surrender, then I must remove you from the battlefield to a POW camp and keep you safe. If, for example, Kitchener said, "take no prisoners", that was very different from "shoot prisoners!" So Morant and Handcock made two very basic errors: Once you've accepted the surrender, you take them to the railway line and get them shipped off to Bermuda, or wherever. At that point, the sensible thing to do was to ship them off to a POW camp. The next error was to shoot these guys in front of a neutral witness, and then you kill the witness. These are a series of terrible errors of judgement. Because they killed a German missionary, the Kaiser (became) involved. [...] Technically, the two "Aussies" were British officers. The problem was you were dealing with an unstable set-up in the BVC. It had just been formed. I don't see a regular Australian unit behaving that way. I rather suspect why no British guys were shot was that they were either regular army or militia, or yeomanry, all of which are very unlikely to actually shoot prisoners. I think no British were shot because they hadn't made the mistake of shooting prisoners who'd already surrendered."

Jim Unkles, an Australian lawyer, submitted two petitions during October 2009, one to Queen Elizabeth II and the other to the House of Representatives Petitions Committee, to review the convictions and sentences of Morant, Handcock, and Witton. The petitions were referred to the British Crown by the Australian Attorney General. On Monday, 27 February 2012, in a speech delivered to the House of Representatives on the hundred-and-tenth anniversary of the sentencing of the three men, Alex Hawke, the Member for Mitchell (NSW), described the case for the pardons as "strong and compelling".

During November 2010, the British Ministry of Defence stated that the appeal had been rejected: "After detailed historical and legal consideration, the Secretary of State has concluded that no new primary evidence has come to light which supports the petition to overturn the original courts-martial verdicts and sentences." The decision was supported by Australian military historian Craig Wilcox and by South African local historian Charles Leach, but Jim Unkles continues to campaign for a judicial inquiry.

During October 2011, then Australian Attorney General Robert McClelland incorrectly claimed by ABC radio that the executed men did not have legal representation at the Courts Martial. In fact, Major J. F. Thomas represented the men.

Nicola Roxon replaced Robert McClelland as attorney general on 12 December 2011. On 9 May 2012, she indicated that the Australian government would not pursue the issue further with the British, as there was no doubt that the three men had committed the killings for which they were convicted, and the Australian government's position is that pardons are appropriate only when an offender is both "morally and technically innocent" of the offence. Roxon also noted the seriousness of the offences involved, explaining that "I consider that seeking a pardon for these men could be rightly perceived as 'glossing over' very grave criminal acts." After Roxon's announcement, McClelland said he would write to the British government expressing his concern about the lack of procedural fairness for the three accused.

== Discovery of relics ==
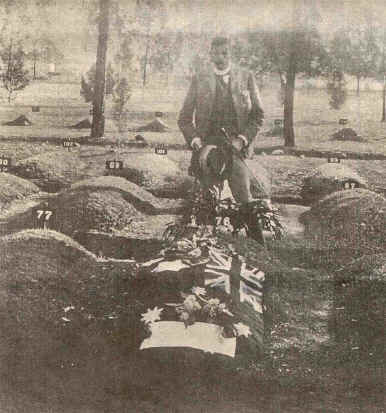
Major Thomas standing over the joint grave of Morant and Handcock (1902).

External image
- Photo of the grave of Morant and Handcock. Source:Genealogical Society of South Africa

During April 2016 it was announced that a person searching through rubbish at the council tip in Tenterfield, New South Wales, had recovered a rotting hessian sack containing an old mail bag; this was found to contain numerous items that likely belonged to Morant. The items found included a number of personal effects engraved with Morant's name and/or his initials, including a penny on a leather thong, engraved with his name, which has a roughly circular nick on the edge. Other Morant effects contained in the bag included fragments of a trumpet, a bayonet scabbard, a bandolier, a cigarette case, brass drinking cups engraved with the initials HM, army field mess equipment, and a Boer War medal. The cache also included an Australian red ensign. The ensign had been signed by Thomas in ink on one of the white stars and has the following inscription:

This flag bore witness [to] utter scapegoats of the Empire Feb 27 1902 Pretoria.

Signed J F Thomas.

Handcock Feb 17 1868 Feb 27 1902 RIP.

Lt Henry H Morant Dec 9 1864 Feb 27 1902 Pretoria RIP.

The bag also contained newspaper clippings and books and papers pertaining to Sir Henry Parkes and the Australian Federation process. A significant quantity of badly damaged documents found in the bag were discarded by the anonymous finder before he realised the significance of the trove. The anonymous finder – known only as "Mr Collector" – subsequently donated the items to Tenterfield's Henry Parkes School of Arts museum, where they are now on public display.

== See also ==
- Breaker Morant (film) – 1980 film by Bruce Beresford
- Breaker Morant (play) – Play written by Kenneth G. Ross
- Court martial of Breaker Morant – 1902 prosecution of six British Army soldiers for crimes during the Second Boer War
- Military history of Australia during the Second Boer War
- Pardons for Morant, Handcock and Witton – Petitions for Australian Second Boer War soldiers
