= Pardons for Morant, Handcock and Witton =

Petitions for Australian Second Boer War soldiers

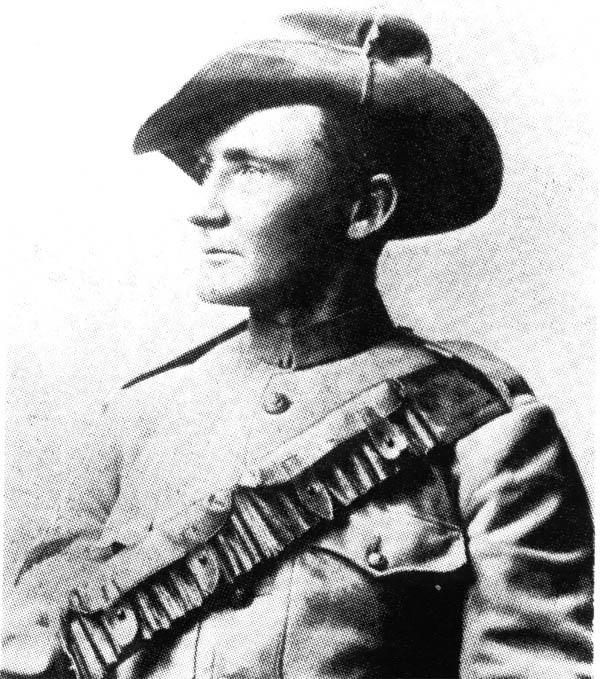
Harry Harbord "Breaker" Morant (1900).

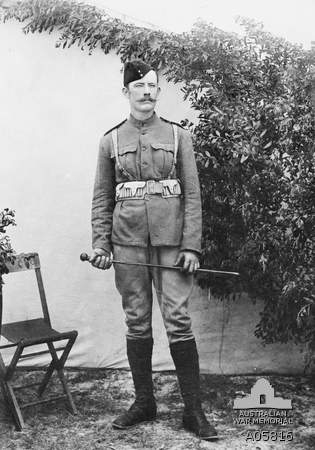
Peter Joseph Handcock (1900).

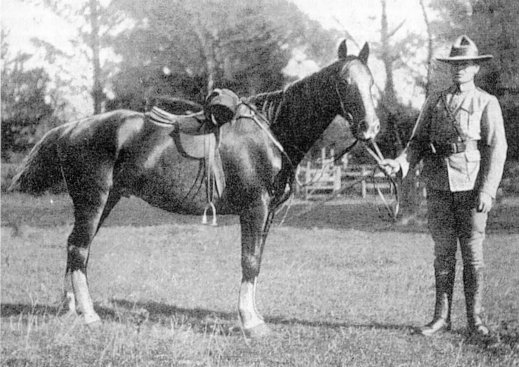
Lieutenant G.R. Witton, Bushveldt Carbineers (1901).

Pardons for Morant, Handcock and Witton, three Australian soldiers, were sought from their court-martial convictions for the murder of Boer prisoners-of-war and local civilians during the Second Boer War.

Following four courts martial in early 1902, Lieutenants Peter Joseph Handcock and Harry "Breaker" Morant, of the Bushveldt Carbineers (BVC) of the British Army, were executed by a firing squad of Cameron Highlanders, in Pretoria, South Africa, on 27 February 1902, 18 hours after they had been sentenced. Lord Kitchener signed their death warrants.

Following the court recommending mercy in his case, the sentence of a third officer, Lieutenant George Ramsdale Witton, was commuted to life imprisonment by Lord Kitchener. Following public pressure, Witton was released on 11 August 1904, but never pardoned.

In 2009, an Australian military lawyer, Commander James William Unkles of the Royal Australian Naval Reserve, sent petitions for pardons for all three men to both Queen Elizabeth II and to the Petitions Committee of the Australian House of Representatives, but both governments declined them.

South Africans have often opposed pardons for Morant, Handcock and Witton. In a 2012 book published in South Africa, Charles Leach summed up the arguments against pardons, citing as precedents cases including: the 1474 trial of Peter von Hagenbach; the 1813 prosecution of Ensign Hugh Maxwell for murdering French POW Charles Cottier at Glencorse Barracks, Scotland during the Napoleonic Wars, and; the US Army court martial of Lieutenant William Calley and other soldiers responsible for the My Lai Massacre, during the Vietnam War. In addition, the "superior orders" defense argument, used by Major J. F. Thomas at the trial of Morant, Handcock and Witton, later gained notoriety when many of those prosecuted for Nazi war crimes at the Nuremberg Trials attempted to use it, leading to it being known as the "Nuremberg Defense".

== Witton petition ==
In 1904, a printed petition to King Edward VII was circulated in Australia, for signature by interested parties, requesting clemency in the form of (a) a pardon for George Witton, and (b) the immediate release of Witton from his incarceration. At least one copy of the petition, signed by thirty-seven individuals from the town of Colebrook, Tasmania, is extant.

In 1907, the publication in Australia of Witton's book Scapegoats of the Empire revived debate about the convictions.

== Unkles' petitions ==
In October 2009, the Australian military lawyer, Commander James William Unkles, of the Royal Australian Naval Reserve, sent petitions for pardons for Morant, Handcock, and Witton to both Queen Elizabeth II and to the Petitions Committee of the Australian House of Representatives.

The first petition was considered by the British Government, on behalf of the Queen—"The petition argued that the convictions were unsafe and that their trial was unfair because the men were denied the right to communicate with the Australian government, refused an opportunity to prepare their cases and blocked from lodging an appeal."—and, in November 2010, the UK Ministry of Defence issued a statement that the appeal had been rejected:

After detailed historical and legal consideration, the Secretary of State has concluded that no new primary evidence has come to light which supports the petition to overturn the original courts-martial verdicts and sentences.

The second petition was considered by the House of Representatives' Petitions Committee at a public hearing on Monday, 15 March 2010. Unkles appeared before the committee, along with others, including the historian Craig Wilcox. On Monday, 27 February 2012, in a speech delivered to the House of Representatives on the 110-year anniversary of the sentencing of the three men, Alex Hawke MP described the case for the pardons as "strong and compelling".

== Roxon's rejection ==
In May 2012, Attorney General Nicola Roxon informed Unkles that the Australian Government would not approach the British Government to seek a pardon for Morant because he, Handcock and Witton did, in fact, kill unarmed Boer prisoners and others. Roxon's letter to Unkles stated that in Australia "a pardon for a Commonwealth offence would generally only be granted where the offender is both morally and technically innocent of the offence". Moreover, her letter stated that "Despite the time that has passed ... I consider seeking a pardon ... could be rightly perceived as glossing over very grave criminal acts".

== 2018 motion of "Sincere Regret" and posthumous medal issuance ==
After continued campaigning by James Unkles following the previous rejections and continuing onwards, Member for Parliament Scott Buchholz tabled a motion in the House of Representatives on 12 February, 2018, which was passed. The motion moved to acknowledge that Lieutenants Morant, Handcock and Witton were "convicted of committing a serious crime;" but also acknowledges "the serious deficiencies in the handling of the legal case against the three men, including the right to appeal their sentences by their legal advocate, Major James Francis Thomas, the opportunity to seek intervention by the Australian Government and the ability to contact their families to inform them of their plight;" and also expresses "sincere regret that Lieutenants Morant, Handcock and Witton were denied procedural fairness contrary to law and that this had cruel and unjust consequences;" and expressing "sympathy to the descendants of these men as they were not tried and sentenced in accordance with the law of 1902". Whilst listed as "Private Business", the Motion was passed and has been recorded in Hansard, appended to the Further Reading section below, and is intended as a Reference to cite this Motion.

Continued campaigning efforts from James Unkles led to the issuing of posthumous replica medals for Morant, Handcock, and Witton, with the medals being presented in accordance due to service. The first of these replica medals awarded, according to Contact Magazine, was to one of Witton's surviving descendants, Brian Turvey (his great nephew), on November 1, 2021. These were Witton's Queen's South Africa medal and the King's South Africa medal. Plans were also being made in 2021 to provide the replica medals to the descendants of Morant and Handcock once arrangements could be made for the presentation. A reference article showing the issuance and intention is provided below in Further Reading for the Reference list.

== See also ==
- Court-martial of Breaker Morant
- Breaker Morant (play)
- Breaker Morant (film)
- Nullum crimen sine lege
- Nulla poena sine culpa
