= George Witton =

Australian army officer

George Ramsdale Witton
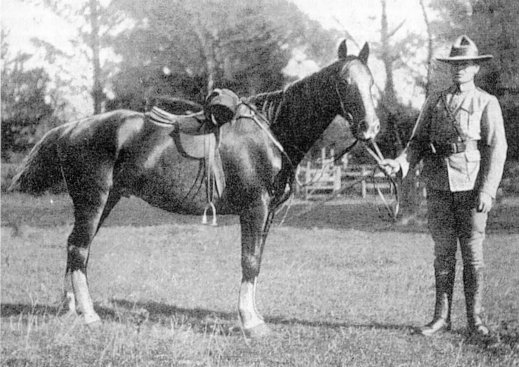
- Lieutenant G.R. Witton, Bushveldt Carbineers (1901)
- Born: 28 June 1874; Victoria, Australia
- Died: 14 August 1942 (aged 68); Queensland, Australia
- Status: Deceased
- Motive: Superior orders
- Convictions: Murder (8 counts); Manslaughter
- Penalty: Death; commuted to life imprisonment

Details
- Victims: 9+
- Span of crimes: 11 August – 23 September 1901
- Country: South African Republic
- Targets: POWs and civilians
- Date apprehended: 23 October 1901
- Military career
- Allegiance: British Empire
- Rank: Lieutenant
- Units: South Australian Mounted Rifles; Bushveldt Carbineers
- Conflicts: Second Boer War

George Ramsdale Witton (28 June 1874 – 14 August 1942) was a lieutenant in the Bushveldt Carbineers in the Boer War in South Africa. He was sentenced to death for murder after the shooting of nine Boer prisoners. He was subsequently reprieved by Lieutenant-General Viscount Kitchener on the grounds that he was following the orders of his colleagues. However, Lieutenants Peter Handcock and Harry "Breaker" Morant, who were court martialled with him, were both executed by firing squad on 27 February 1902.

== Early life and involvement in the Boer War ==
Witton was born into a farming family near Warrnambool, Victoria, Australia, with at least one brother. He served as a gunner in the Victorian Artillery Corps, then enlisted in the Victorian Imperial Bushmen for the Boer War and was promoted from Corporal to Squadron Quartermaster-Sergeant. Major Robert Lenehan then enlisted him into the Bushveldt Carbineers with a commission as Lieutenant.

After the killing of a number of Boer prisoners, Witton was one of four officers charged by the British Army with murder, and was convicted.(Witton wrote that he had fired at an escaping Boer to keep him away, although later in "Scapegoats of the Empire," he admitted that he had shot an escaping Boer prisoner who had tried to seize Witton's carbine). However, he strongly protested and secured a legal opinion from Isaac Isaacs KC, an Australian member of parliament, who recommended that he petition the King for a pardon. Kitchener indeed commuted Witton's sentence to life imprisonment. After further protests from numerous British and Australian politicians, including the rising Winston Churchill, Witton was released from prison on 11 August 1904. However, he was not pardoned. He had been ill twice in prison in England, once from arsenic fumes in a metal shop and once from typhoid fever. He returned to Australia on 12 November 1904, embittered after serving nearly three years at HMP Lewes, and wrote a book giving his version of the events involving Morant, Handcock and the BVC.

== Scapegoats of the Empire book ==
Witton's book, Scapegoats of the Empire, was originally published in 1907 by D. W. Paterson of Melbourne, but was long unavailable. It is claimed that prior to its reprint in 1982 by the Australian publishing house Angus & Robertson, only seven copies of the book survived in various Australian state libraries and in the possession of Witton's family. There has been a persistent though unproven allegation that the book was suppressed by the Australian government, and that most copies were destroyed on official instructions; another explanation is that most of the copies were destroyed in an accidental fire at the publisher's warehouse. The 1982 reprinting was inspired by the success of a film based on the book, entitled Breaker Morant. George Witton's cousin, Cecily Adams of Castlecrag (a Sydney suburb), owned the copyright for Scapegoats of the Empire following George's death. Cecily was also aware of some additional documentation written by George, which he had always refused to make public. Determined that a further edition, which included this additional material, should be released, Cecily arranged in 1989 for a new edition to be published by Adlib Books of Bath, England, through an arrangement with Angus & Robertson. In this version Cecily Adams was herself identified as the copyright owner.

Witton's main assertion, as indicated by the book's provocative title, was that he, Morant, and Handcock were made scapegoats by the British authorities in South Africa. In the book, he argued that the trio were unfairly arrested and put on trial, and the subsequent court-martial and executions were carried out for political reasons; partly to cover up a controversial and secret "no prisoners" policy promulgated by Lord Kitchener and partly to appease the Boer government over the killing of Afrikaner prisoners of war in order to facilitate a peace treaty (the Treaty of Vereeniging as signed on 31 May 1902).

Witton also claimed that many of the accusations about them, which led to their arrest and trial, were made by disaffected members of their regiment whose rebellious behaviour had been suppressed by Morant and Handcock.

== Later life ==
When World War I broke out, an embittered Witton, then aged 40, did not rush to enlist. After former and future Prime Minister Andrew Fisher pledged during the 1914 general election that Australia would defend Britain "to the last man and last shilling," Witton intimated that he would be that last man.

He lived in Gippsland, Victoria and in Queensland where he was a dairy farmer at 'Dundarrah' property, Coalstoun Lakes, and by 1928, director of the Biggenden cheese factory. Some of Witton's correspondence was cited in the 1932 Queensland royal commission into the butter industry and commissions paid to butter company managers. Dundarrah was sold in September 1936. He was involved as the secretary and treasurer of the Biggenden Golf Club, and a cup was in his name; and involved in competitive rifle shooting.

George married Mary Louisa Humphrey in September 1913. She died in March 1931, aged 56 years, and was buried at the Lutwyche Cemetery, Brisbane. In September 1932, he married Carolen Ellen Stranger. He did not have any children, although George and Mary Witton in 1928 sought to adopt an orphan, only to be denied on the grounds that George Witton had been dismissed with disgrace from the British armed forces.

In 1929, George Witton revealed in a letter to James Francis Thomas that Peter Handcock had confessed to murdering Rev. Daniel Heese on Morant's orders shortly after they were both acquitted. At the time, Maj. Thomas was still unable to forgive himself for having failed to save Morant and Handcock's lives and had continued battling for decades to prove his clients innocence and to keep the case in the public eye. Upon receiving Witton's letter and realizing the degree to which his deceased clients had manipulated him, Maj. Thomas was, by all accounts, completely beside himself.

Witton had a heart attack while cranking his car engine, and died in hospital on 14 August 1942, at the age of 68. He was buried with his first wife Mary in Brisbane's Lutwyche Cemetery which, coincidentally, is located on the corner of Gympie and Kitchener Roads. His will indicated he was a retired estate agent, late of 41 Maling Road, Canterbury, Melbourne, Victoria, the executor being his nephew.

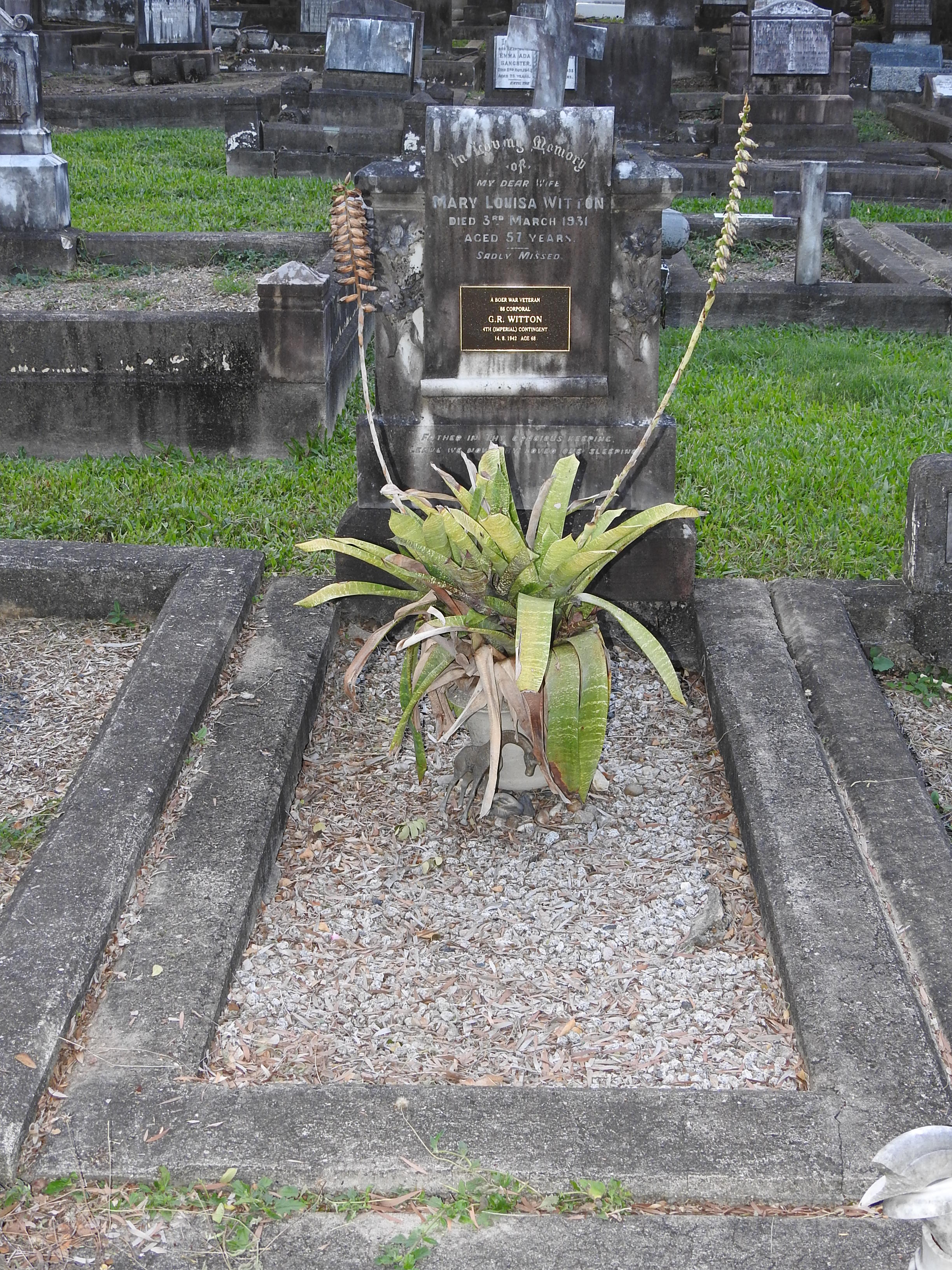
Grave plot (2021).

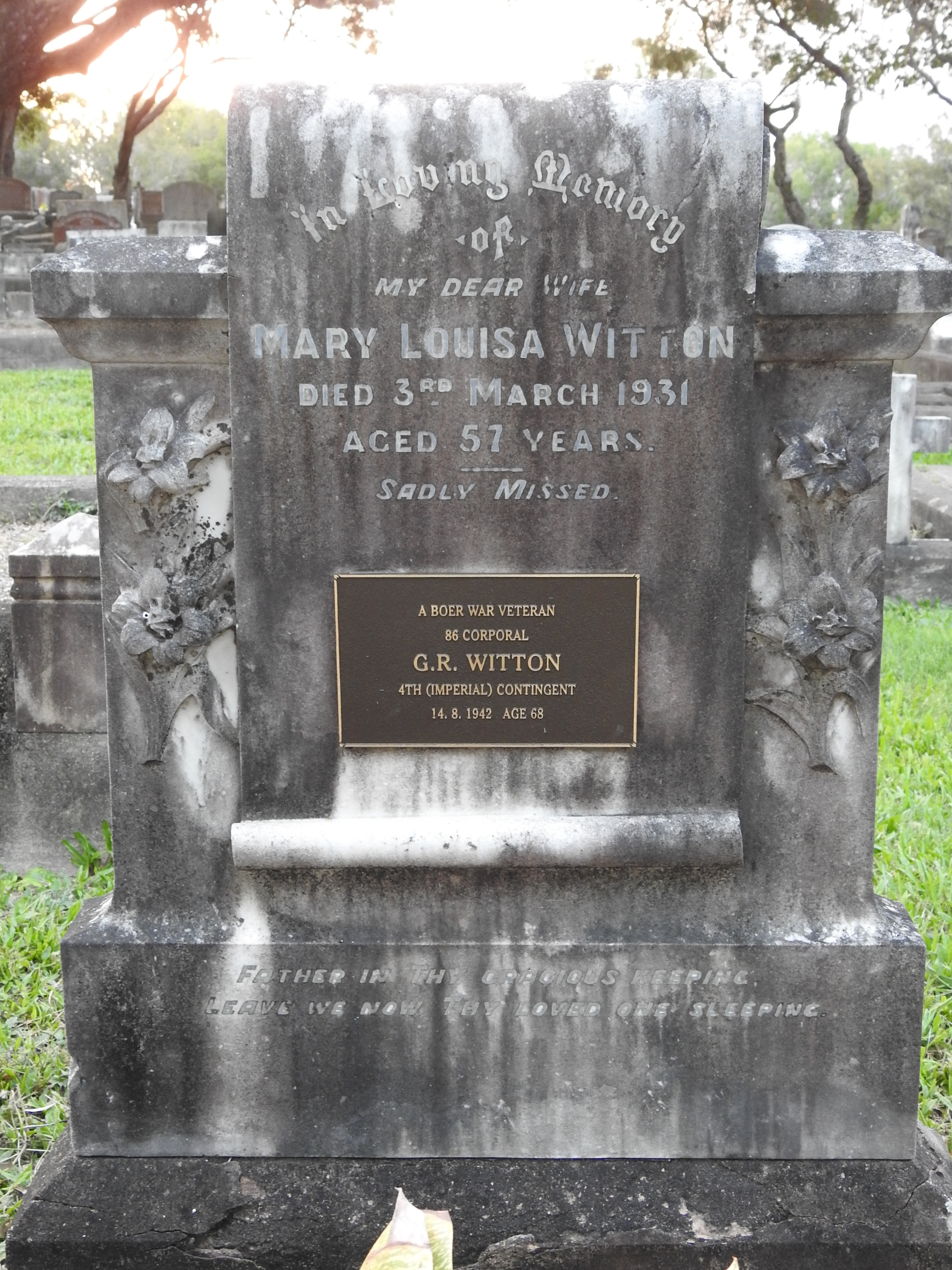
Grave headstone (2021).

== 2009 petitions for review of court martial ==
In 2009, an Australian lawyer and naval reservist, Commander Jim Unkles, submitted personal petitions, requesting a review of the convictions for Morant, Handcock and Witton, to The Crown, in the form of:

- Queen Elizabeth II personally
- the Australian government, in the form of the Australian House of Representatives Petitions Committee

The petitions committee considered Unkles' petition on 15 March 2010. He appeared before it, along with others including historian Craig Wilcox. Committee member Alex Hawke MP stated: "there is in my view serious and compelling evidence that some form of redress should be given, all these years later, to those men executed by the British". The then Attorney-General of Australia, Robert McLelland referred the petition to the UK government.

On behalf of the Crown, Unkles' petition was rejected by UK Defence Secretary Liam Fox, in November 2010.

== See also ==
- Breaker Morant (film) – 1980 film by Bruce Beresford
- Breaker Morant (play) – Play written by Kenneth G. Ross
- Court martial of Breaker Morant – 1902 prosecution of six British Army soldiers for crimes during the Second Boer War
- Pardons for Morant, Handcock and Witton – Petitions for Australian Second Boer War soldiers
