= Peter Handcock =

Australian Army officer

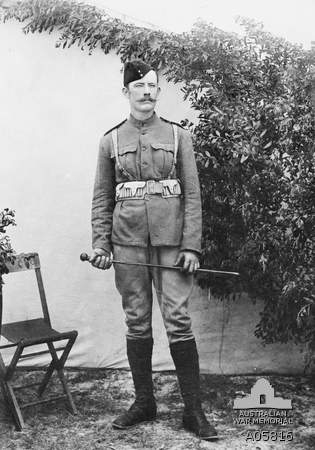
- Peter Joseph Handcock (1900)
- Born: Peter Joseph Handcock; 17 February 1868 near Bathurst, Colony of New South Wales
- Died: 27 February 1902 (aged 34); Pretoria, South African Republic
- Spouse: Bridget Alice Mary Martin (1888–1902; his death)
- Children: 3
- Status: Executed by firing squad
- Convictions: Murder (11 counts); Manslaughter
- Penalty: Death

Details
- Victims: 13+
- Span of crimes: August – 7 September 1901
- Country: South African Republic
- Targets: POWs and civilians
- Date apprehended: 23 October 1901
- Military career
- Allegiance: British Empire
- Service years: 1899 – 1902
- Rank: Lieutenant
- Units: 1st New South Wales Mounted Rifles; Bushveldt Carbineers
- Conflicts: Second Boer War

Peter Joseph Handcock (17 February 1868 – 27 February 1902) was an Australian-born veterinary lieutenant and convicted war criminal who served in the Bushveldt Carbineers during the Boer War in South Africa.

After a court martial, Handcock (along with Harry "Breaker" Morant) was convicted and executed for the murders of nine Boer POWs and three other civilians.

His execution, "which had been carried out without the knowledge and consent of the Australian government", was and remains a controversial issue in Australia.

== Life ==
Peter Joseph Handcock was born at Peel, near Bathurst, New South Wales, to William Handcock (1830–1874), and Bridget Handcock, née Martin (1830–1881) on 17 February 1868

He was apprenticed to a blacksmith at age 12, and later worked as a blacksmith with the Railways Department.

He married his 17-year-old cousin Bridget Alice Mary Martin on 15 July 1888, and they had two sons and a daughter.

== Military service ==
He served in South Africa with the 1st New South Wales Mounted Rifles, and was promoted to farrier-sergeant.

When the NSWMR returned home he obtained a commission in the Bushveldt Carbineers as veterinary and transport officer.

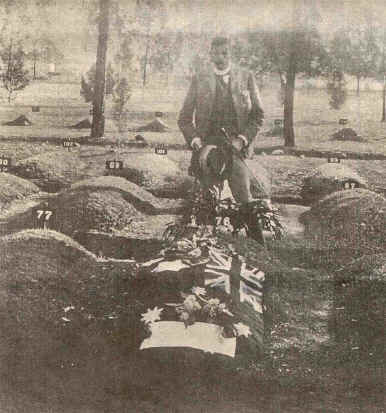
Major Thomas standing over the joint grave of Morant and Handcock (1902)

In early August 1901, Handcock executed an unarmed, wounded Boer prisoner, Floris Visser. Two weeks later, he fatally shot a South African missionary, Reverend Daniel Heese, possibly out of the fear that he would report his crimes.

Handcock also organized and participated in the executions of eight surrendering Boers. "We are justified in shooting everything in sight," Handcock said to a fellow trooper.

On 7 September 1901, Hancock and Morant heard that three Boers were approaching their camp. They met the three with two other soldiers. The Boers were Roelf van Staden and his two sons, 16-year-old Roelf Jr. and 12-year-old Chris, who was very sick from a fever.

Morant quietly told his men that when the Stadens reached a clearing, to wait until he said “lay down your arms,” then shoot the three after they calmed down. When Handcock and the two other soldiers pointed their rifles at the Stadens ready to fire, the family looked at them confused and scared. They calmed down after Morant gave his command, and were then suddenly shot as he had planned.

External image
- Photo of the grave of Morant and Handcock. Source:Genealogical Society of South Africa

== Execution ==
Handcock and Morant were court-martialled, convicted, and executed in Pretoria by a firing squad drawn from the Queen's Own Cameron Highlanders on 27 February 1902 on murder charges for shooting nine Boer POWs. Handcock was also found guilty of manslaughter for his role in the illegal execution of Visser.

While the defendants were found guilty of killing these POWs and civilians, they were acquitted of murdering Daniel Heese. However, in 1929, it was revealed by George Witton in a letter to James Francis Thomas that Handcock had confessed to Witton of murdering Heese shortly after he was acquitted.

== Petitions for review of convictions and sentences ==
In 2010, petitions were submitted for the review of the convictions of Handcock and his colleagues.

== See also ==
- Breaker Morant (film) – 1980 film by Bruce Beresford
- Breaker Morant (play) – Play written by Kenneth G. Ross
- Court martial of Breaker Morant – 1902 prosecution of six British Army soldiers for crimes during the Second Boer War
- Pardons for Morant, Handcock and Witton – Petitions for Australian Second Boer War soldiers
