= Breaker Morant (play) =

Play written by Kenneth G. Ross

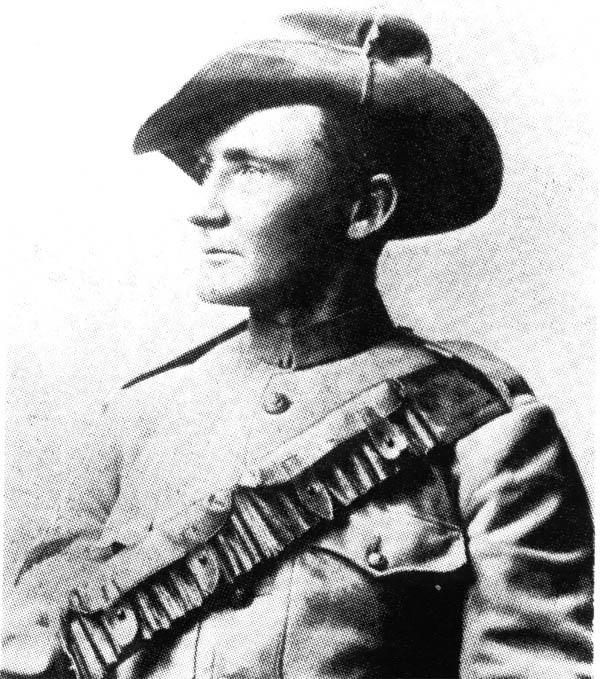
- "Breaker" Morant
- Original language: English
- Written by: Kenneth G. Ross
- Characters: Lieutenant Morant; Lieutenant Witton; Lieutenant Handcock; President of the Court-Martial; Dr. Johnson; Mr. Robinson; Colonel Hamilton; Major Thomas; Lord Kitchener; Sgt-Major Drummitt; Trooper Botha; Captain Taylor; Corporal Sharp; Van Rooyan; Interrogators; Military personnel
- Subject: The Boer Wars, Courts-martial, Military justice, Summary execution
- Genre: Drama
- Setting: South Africa.

Premiere
- Date: 2 February 1978
- Place: Athenaeum Theatre; Melbourne, Victoria

Breaker Morant: A Play in Two Acts is an Australian play written by Kenneth G. Ross, centred on the court-martial and the last days of Lieutenant Harry "Breaker" Morant (1864–1902) of the Bushveldt Carbineers (BVC), that was first performed at the Athenaeum Theatre, in Melbourne, Victoria, Australia, on Thursday, 2 February 1978, by the Melbourne Theatre Company.

Described at the time as an "interesting, though underwritten biographical study", the first performance of the play was directed and designed by John Sumner, the founding director of the Melbourne Theatre Company.

== First performance ==
The cast of the first performance of the play, directed and designed by John Sumner, on 2 February 1978 were:

- Lieutenant Harry (Breaker) Morant — Terence Donovan
- Lieutenant George Witton — Gary Day
- Lieutenant Peter Handcock — John Stanton
- First Interrogator; President of the Court-Martial; Lieutenant-Colonel Henry Cuthbert Denny (1858-?) — Barry Hill
- Second Interrogator; Dr. Johnson; Officer — Edward Hepple
- Third Interrogator; Mr. Robinson; Officer; Colonel Hamilton — Anthony Hawkins
- Major James Francis Thomas — Jonathan Hardy
- Major Bolton — Gerard Maguire
- Lord Kitchener — Simon Chilvers
- Sgt-Major Drummitt; Sergeant — Rob Harrison
- Trooper; Trooper Botha; Trooper — Gary Down
- Corporal; Captain Taylor; Corporal — Michael Edgar
- Trooper; Corporal Sharp; Trooper — Roy Baldwin
- Trooper; Van Rooyan; Trooper — Ian Suddards
- Trooper; Officer; Trooper — Peter Dunn
- Officer — Detlef Bauer
- Trooper — Michael Morrell

== Review of first performance ==
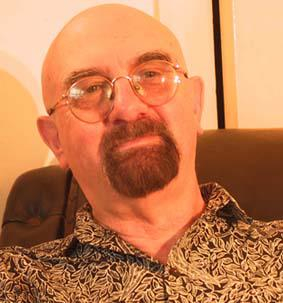
Kenneth G. Ross (playwright)

"In this interesting, though under-written, biographical study, Adelaide writer, Kenneth Ross, turns his attention to the Boer War and to an unsavoury episode involving two Australian lieutenants, who were tried and executed by the British." (Childs, 1978).

== Conversion to a movie ==
The script of Ross's play was almost immediately converted into the screenplay for Bruce Beresford's 1980 film Breaker Morant.

The screenplay of the film, to which Ross had made a considerable contribution as a writer (i.e., in addition to his stage play having been the inspiration and basis for the screenplay), was nominated for the 1981 Academy Award for Best Writing, Screenplay Based on Material from Another Medium.

== See also ==
- Breaker Morant
- Breaker Morant (film)
- Court martial of Breaker Morant
