= Kit Denton =

British-Australian writer (1928–1997)

- Born: Arnold Christopher Ditkofsky; 5 May 1928; Stepney, London, England
- Died: 14 April 1997 (aged 68); Wentworth Falls, New South Wales, Australia
- Occupations: Writer; radio announcer; TV director; TV producer; critic
- Children: Joanna, Andrew and Phillipa

Arnold Christopher "Kit" Denton (5 May 1928 – 14 April 1997), originally Arnold Ditkofsky, was a prominent Australian writer and broadcaster. Denton was born in England and was of Polish Jewish descent. He is the father of comedian and television presenter Andrew Denton.

== Early life ==
Denton was born in the London suburb of Stepney and was raised in the East End. He joined the British Army where he served with the British Forces Broadcasting Service in Germany. Denton emigrated to Australia in the late 1940s, and worked as a gold miner in Kalgoorlie, Western Australia.

== Broadcasting and writing career in Australia ==
From 1951 until 1965, Denton worked for the Australian Broadcasting Commission as an announcer, and eventually moved on to screenwriting, producing and directing television. In the 1970s, an anonymous television critic for The Australian newspaper was revealed to be Kit Denton, writing under the pseudonym "Janus".

Denton had an abiding interest in military history, and is best known for his novel The Breaker (1973), based on the story of Breaker Morant. Although it was widely assumed that the film Breaker Morant was based on Denton's book, it was in fact based on a play by Kenneth G. Ross, who successfully sued publisher Angus & Robertson when they publicised Denton's novel as the source for the film. Denton also wrote For Queen and Commonwealth, about British military forces in the late 19th century, and Gallipoli: One Long Grave (1986), a book about the Battle of Gallipoli.

== Death ==
Denton died in April 1997 at his home in the Blue Mountains, New South Wales.

== Legacy ==
In August 2006, Denton's son Andrew announced a new A$25,000 writing scholarship in his father's name: the Kit Denton Fellowship, which would be presented to members of the Australian Writers' Guild from 2007 onwards.

== Bibliography ==
- A Walk Around My Cluttered Mind (1968)
- The Breaker: a novel (1973, ISBN 0-207-14344-7)
- The Thinkable Man (1976, ISBN 0-207-13279-8)
- The Breaker: a novel, with a selection of the verse of Harry (the Breaker) Morant / Kit Denton (1980, revised edition ISBN 0-207-14268-8)
- Gallipoli illustrated / compiled and written by Kit Denton (1981, ISBN 0-7270-1462-5)
- Closed File: The True Story Behind the Execution of Breaker Morant and Peter Handcock (1983, ISBN 0-7270-1739-X)
- Fiddlers Bridge (1986, ISBN 0-949118-10-9)
- Gallipoli, One Long Grave (1986, ISBN 0-949118-04-4)
- For Queen and Commonwealth (1987, ISBN 0-949118-08-7)
- Burning Spear (1990, ISBN 0-947245-06-5 (hbk) and ISBN 0-947245-07-3 (pbk))
- Red on White (1991, ISBN 0-330272-19-5)

== Credits ==
- Demonstrator (1971) – screenplay
