= James Francis Thomas =

Australian solicitor and British Army officer

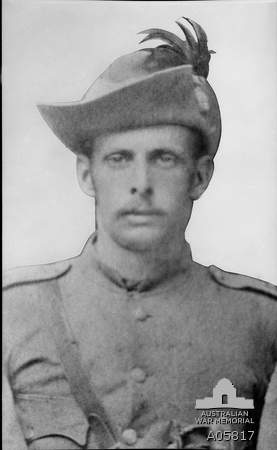
- James Francis Thomas (1899)
- Born: 25 July 1861; St Marys, New South Wales, Australia
- Died: 11 November 1942 (aged 81); Boonoo Boonoo, New South Wales, Australia
- Occupations: Solicitor, newspaper proprietor, soldier

Major James Francis Thomas (25 July 1861 – 11 November 1942), was a solicitor from Tenterfield, New South Wales.

As Major Thomas, he defended Lieutenants Peter Joseph Handcock, George Ramsdale Witton, and Harry "Breaker" Morant, of the Bushveldt Carbineers (BVC) of the British Army, in their trial for the murder of nine Boer prisoners-of-war during the Second Boer War.

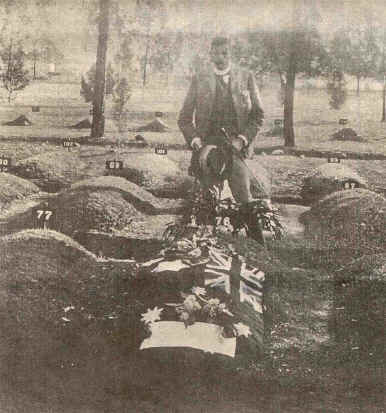
Major Thomas, standing behind the joint grave of Handcock and Morant (1902)

== Education ==
He was educated at The King's School, Parramatta, and at the University of Sydney.

== Law ==
He served as an articled clerk in a reputable Sydney law practice.

He was (unconditionally) admitted to practise as a solicitor on 28 May 1887.

== Tenterfield Star ==
He was also the owner-operator of the Tenterfield Star newspaper for sixteen years, from 1898.

== Death ==
He died on his property at Boonoo Boonoo, near Tenterfield, on Remembrance Day, 11 November 1942.

== See also ==
- Court-martial of Breaker Morant
- Pardon for Morant, Handcock and Witton
- Discovery of Breaker Morant relics
