= Magdol Commando =

Magol Commando
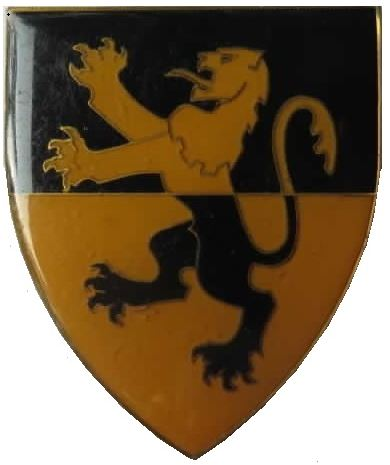
- Magol Commando emblem
- Active: 1890-as part of the Waterberg Commando
- Country: South Africa
- Allegiance: Republic of South Africa; Republic of South Africa
- Branch: South African Army; South African Army
- Type: Infantry
- Role: Light Infantry
- Size: One Battalion
- Part of: South African Infantry Corps; Army Territorial Reserve, Group 14 and later Group 29
- Garrison/HQ: Onverwacht neighborhood Lephalale

Magol Commando was a light infantry regiment of the South African Army. It formed part of the South African Army Infantry Formation as well as the South African Territorial Reserve.

== History ==
=== Origin ===
This unit can trace its origins as part of the original Waterberg Commando to just before the Anglo Boer War as the Transvaal Republic became more nervous of its British adversaries in Bechaunaland and Rhodesia.

=== Operations ===
==== With the Zuid Afrikaanse Republiek ====
The Waterberg Commando gathered at Nylstroom on 11 October 1899. After receiving news of the outbreak of war, this Commando proceeded to the confluence of the Limpopo and Palala rivers to join with the Soutpansberg Commando, cross into Bechaunaland and destroy railway infrastructure.

==== With the UDF ====
By 1902 all Commando remnants were under British military control and disarmed.

By 1912, however previous Commando members could join shooting associations. The Noorden Grens Schietvereninging was formed.

By 1940, such commandos were under control of the National Reserve of Volunteers. This commando performed the duties of a home guard at this stage.

These commandos were formally reactivated by 1948.

==== With the SADF ====
This unit was originally named the Waterberg North Commando but was renamed the Magol Commando around 1972.

The unit was situated in the Onverwacht neighbourhood of Ellisras, now Lephalale.

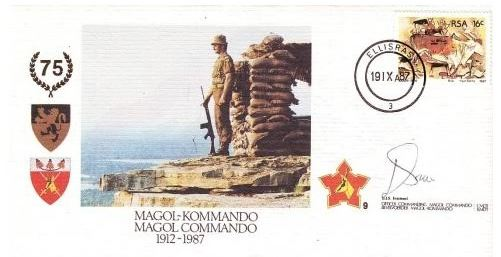
SADF era Magdol Commando commemorative letter

The unit initially resorted under the command of Group 14 but was later transferred to Group 29.

During this era, the unit was mainly used for area force protection, search and cordones as well as stock theft control assistance to the rural police.

==== With the SANDF ====
===== Disbandment =====
This unit, along with all other Commando units was disbanded after a decision by South African President Thabo Mbeki to disband all Commando Units. The Commando system was phased out between 2003 and 2008 "because of the role it played in the apartheid era", according to the Minister of Safety and Security Charles Nqakula.

== Unit Insignia ==
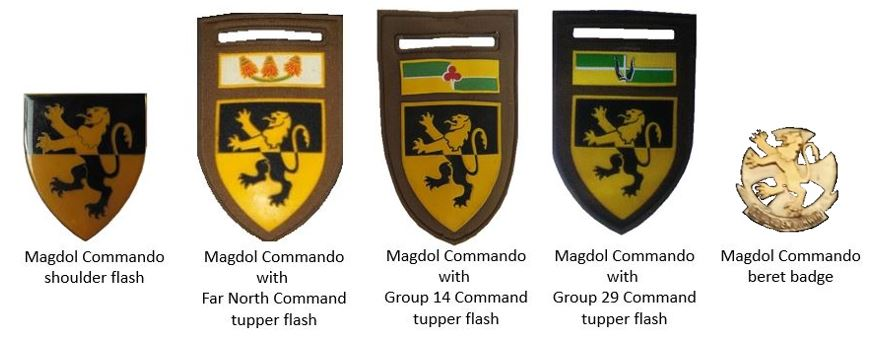
SADF era Magdol Commando insignia

== Leadership ==
- Capt J. Geldenhuys 1912–1939
- Capt L. vd Westhuizen 1939
- Capt G.O. Mel 1940–1948
- Cmdt G.A. Wells 1949–1966
- Cmdt M.G. Eckard 1966–1983
- Cmdt J.J.S. Erasmus 1983

== See also ==
- South African Commando System
