= Soutpansberg Commando =

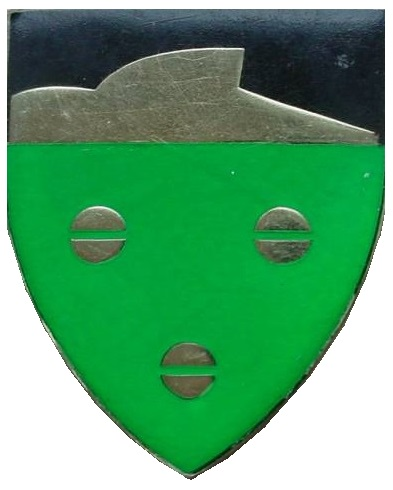
- Active: 1890-
- Country: South Africa
- Allegiance: Republic of South Africa; Republic of South Africa
- Branch: South African Army; South African Army
- Type: Infantry
- Role: Light Infantry
- Size: One Battalion
- Part of: South African Infantry Corps; Army Territorial Reserve
- Garrison/HQ: Musina, formerly Messina Northern Limpopo Province

Soutpansberg Commando was a light infantry regiment of the South African Army. It formed part of the South African Army Infantry Formation as well as the South African Territorial Reserve.

== History ==
=== Origin ===
This unit can trace its origins as part of the Waterberg Commando to just before the Anglo Boer War as the Transvaal Republic became more nervous of its British adversaries in Bechaunaland and Rhodesia.

=== Operations ===
==== With the Zuid Afrikaanse Republiek ====
The Waterberg Commando gathered at Nylstroom on 11 October 1899. After receiving news of the outbreak of war, this Commando proceeded to the confluence of the Limpopo and Palala rivers to join with the Soutpansberg Commando, cross into Bechaunaland and destroy railway infrastructure.

==== With the UDF ====
By 1902 all Commando remnants were under British military control and disarmed.

By 1912, however previous Commando members could join shooting associations.

By 1940, such commandos were under control of the National Reserve of Volunteers.

These commandos were formally reactivated by 1948.

==== With the SADF ====
Soutpansberg Commando fell under the localised Command of Far North Command initially, but with the development of the Soutpansberg Military Area, was eventually transferred to that Command structure.

==== With the SANDF ====
===== Disbandment =====
This unit, along with all other Commando units was disbanded after a decision by South African President Thabo Mbeki to disband all Commando Units. The Commando system was phased out between 2003 and 2008 "because of the role it played in the apartheid era", according to the Minister of Safety and Security Charles Nqakula.

== Unit Insignia ==
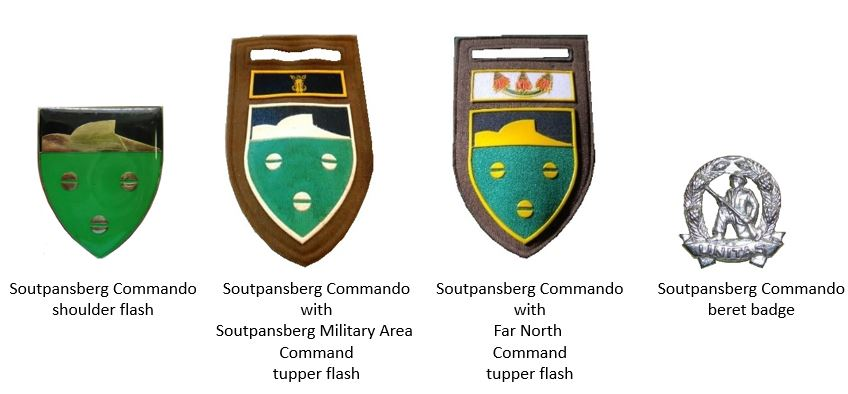
SADF era Soutpansberg Commando insignia

== Leadership ==
Leadership
From	Honorary Colonels	To	Ribbon
	No known incumbents		
From	Commanding Officers	To	Ribbon
	No known incumbents		
From	Regimental Sergeants Major	To	Ribbon
	No known incumbents		

== See also ==
- South African Commando System
