= 116 Battalion =

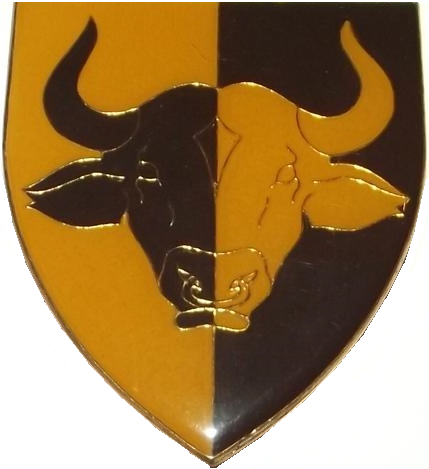
- 116 Battalion emblem
- Active: 1986–1999
- Country: South Africa
- Branch: South African Army
- Type: Motorised infantry
- Part of: South African Army Infantry Corps
- Garrison/HQ: Messina
- Motto: Re Batho Batee Together we are one
- Equipment: Buffel APC, Samil 20

Insignia
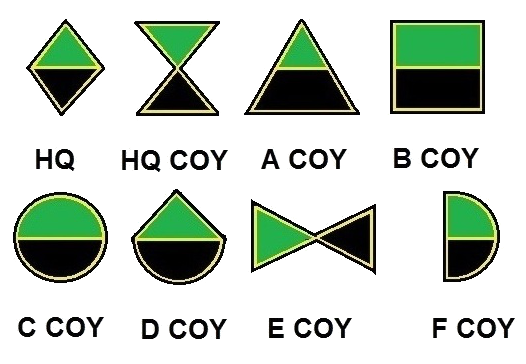
- Company level insignia

- SA Motorised Infantry beret bar circa 1992: SA Motorised Infantry beret bar

116 Battalion was a motorised infantry unit of the South African Army.

== History ==
=== Origin of the black battalions ===
By the late 1970s the South African government had abandoned its opposition to arming black soldiers.

By early 1979, the government approved a plan to form a number of regional African battalions, each with a particular ethnic identity, which would serve under regional SADF commands.

116 Battalion was raised in 1986 as an original platoon of only 14 men but expanded quickly. The first personnel consisted of former Rhodesian soldiers who had moved to South Africa and were mustered by the Intelligence Corps. The battalion was then based in Messina.

64 Tsonga soldiers from 113 Battalion was also integrated in the newly formed battalion. Recruitment was also done from the Lebowa Homeland to finally bring the battalion up to strength.

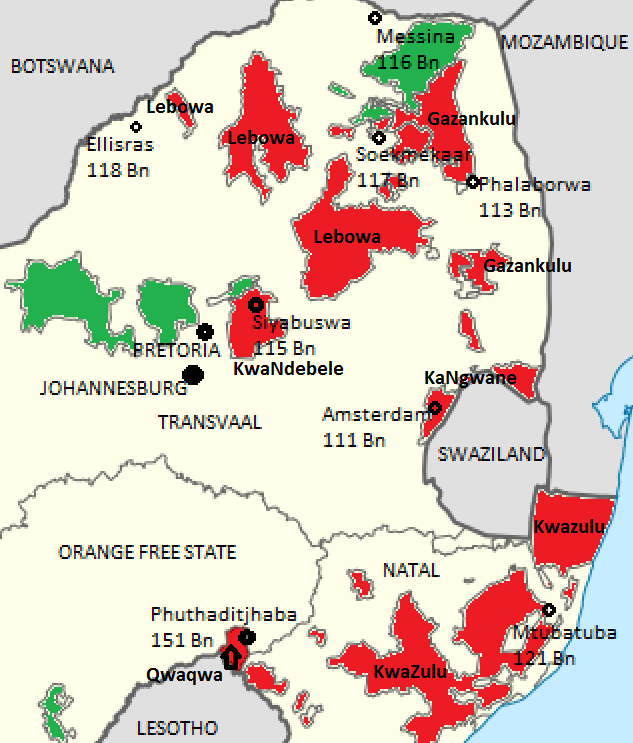
Location of the 100 Battalions in relation to their respective homelands

=== Higher Command ===
116 Battalion initially resorted under Far North Command and finally with the Soutpansberg Military Area.

==== Special Service Companies for Quick Reaction ====
116 Battalion, similar to the SWATF approach, also activated an immediate reaction force (Special Service Company) to deal with any attack and was primarily infantry company strength and fully motorised.

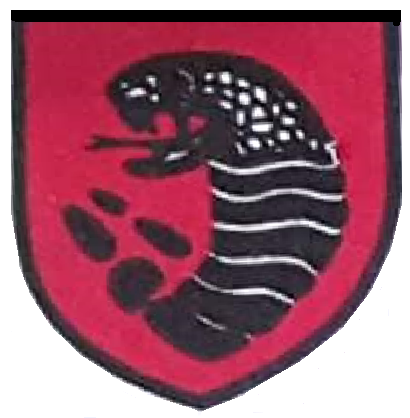
116 Battalion 907 Special Service Company

907 Special Service Company was formed from 116 Battalion's Bravo Company at Spence Shaft in 1986. 907 SSC was based at Madimbo and deployed on Buffels but converted to Cassspirs later.

=== Disbandment ===
116 Battalion was disbanded around 1999 as its main function of border control had been issued to the South African Police Service at that stage.

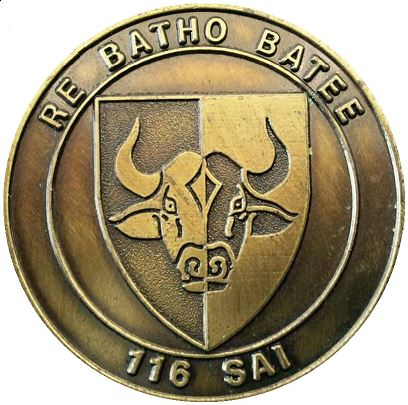
SADF 116 SAI Commemorative medallion

== Insignia ==
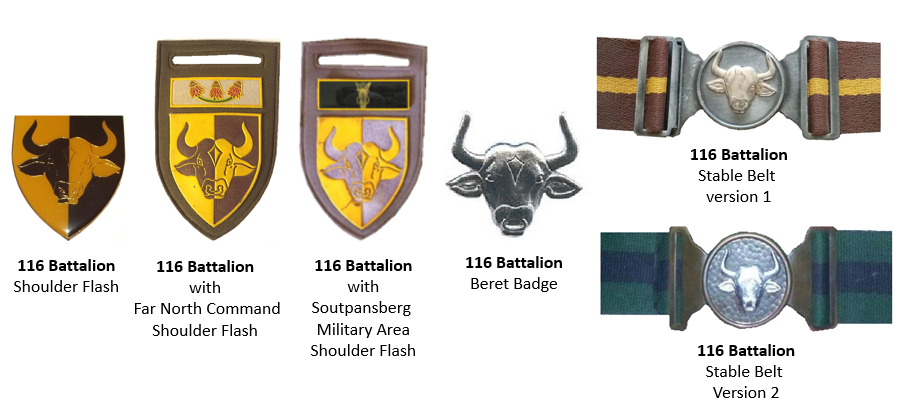
SADF 116 SA Battalion complete insignia

== Notes ==
Peled, A. A question of Loyalty Military Manpower Policy in Multiethinic States, Cornell University Press, 1998, ISBN 0-8014-3239-1 Chapter 2: South Africa: From Exclusion to Inclusion
