= 113 Battalion =

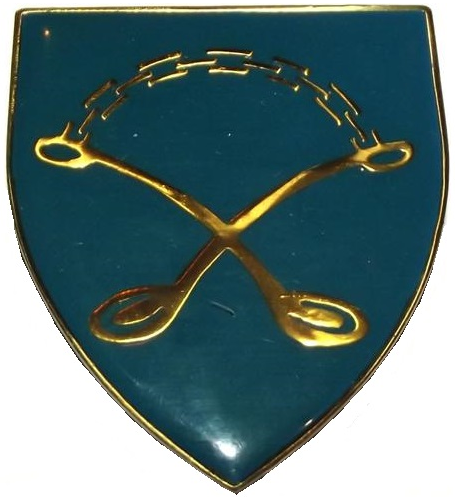
- 113 Battalion emblem
- Active: 1980–1994
- Country: South Africa
- Branch: South African Army
- Type: Motorised infantry
- Part of: South African Army Infantry Corps
- Garrison/HQ: Phalaborwa
- Motto: Servamus We Serve
- Equipment: Buffel APC, Samil 20

Insignia
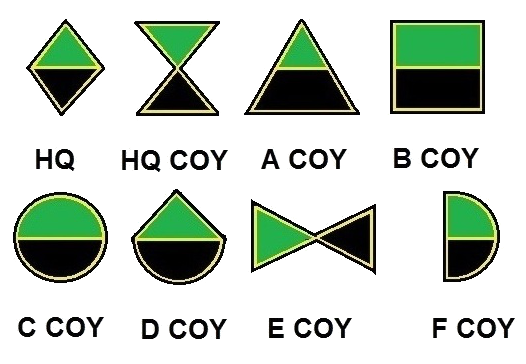
- Company level insignia

- SA Motorised Infantry beret bar circa 1992: SA Motorised Infantry beret bar

113 Battalion was a motorised infantry unit of the South African Army.

== History ==
=== Origin of the black battalions ===
By the late 1970s the South African government had abandoned its opposition to arming black soldiers.

In early 1979, the government approved a plan to form a number of regional African battalions, each with a particular ethnic identity, which would serve in their homeland or under regional SADF commands.

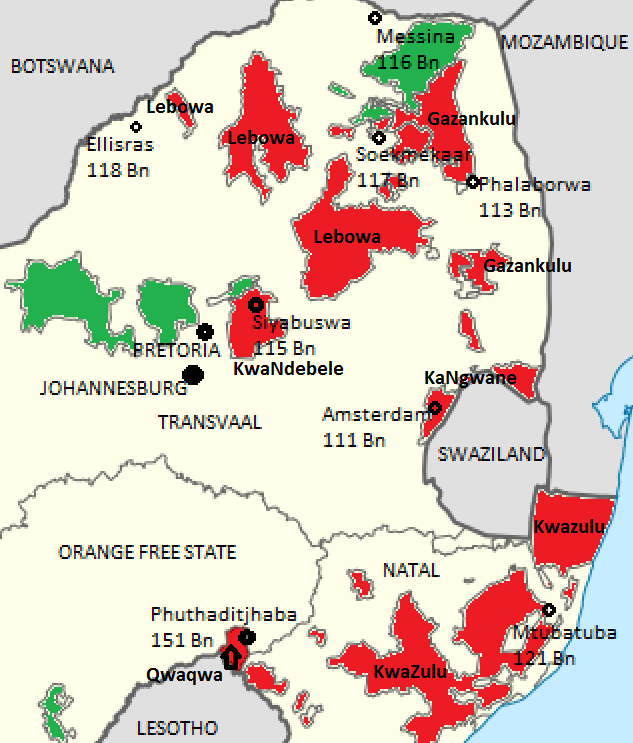
Location of the 100 Battalions in relation to their respective homelands

=== Development of the Gazankulu Defence Force ===
This led to the formation of 113 Battalion for the Tsongas tribe. It is believed that the original intention was for this battalion to form the basis of a future Gazankulu Defence Force.

113 Battalion was raised in 1980 at Phalaborwa in the then Eastern Transvaal. Troops for 113 SA Battalion were recruited from the self-governing territory of Gazankulu.

=== Higher Command ===
113 Battalion resorted under the command of Group 13. 64 soldiers from 113 Battalion was transferred to 116 Battalion when that unit was expanded.

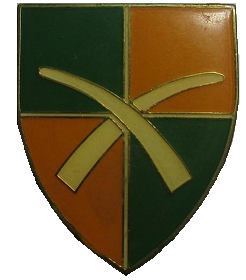
SADF Group 13 emblem

=== Disbandment ===
113 Battalion was later absorbed into 7 South African Infantry Battalion to form a single battalion in the new SANDF.

== Insignia ==
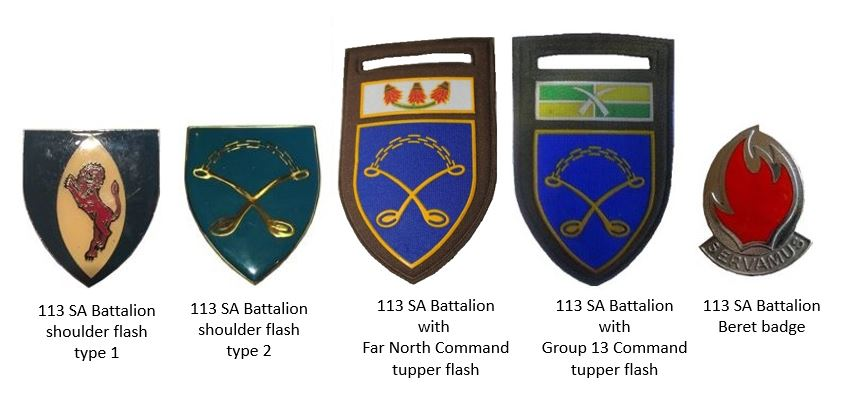
113 Battalion insignia

== Notes ==
Peled, A. A question of Loyalty Military Manpower Policy in Multiethinic States, Cornell University Press, 1998, ISBN 0-8014-3239-1 Chapter 2: South Africa: From Exclusion to Inclusion
