= 7 South African Infantry Battalion =

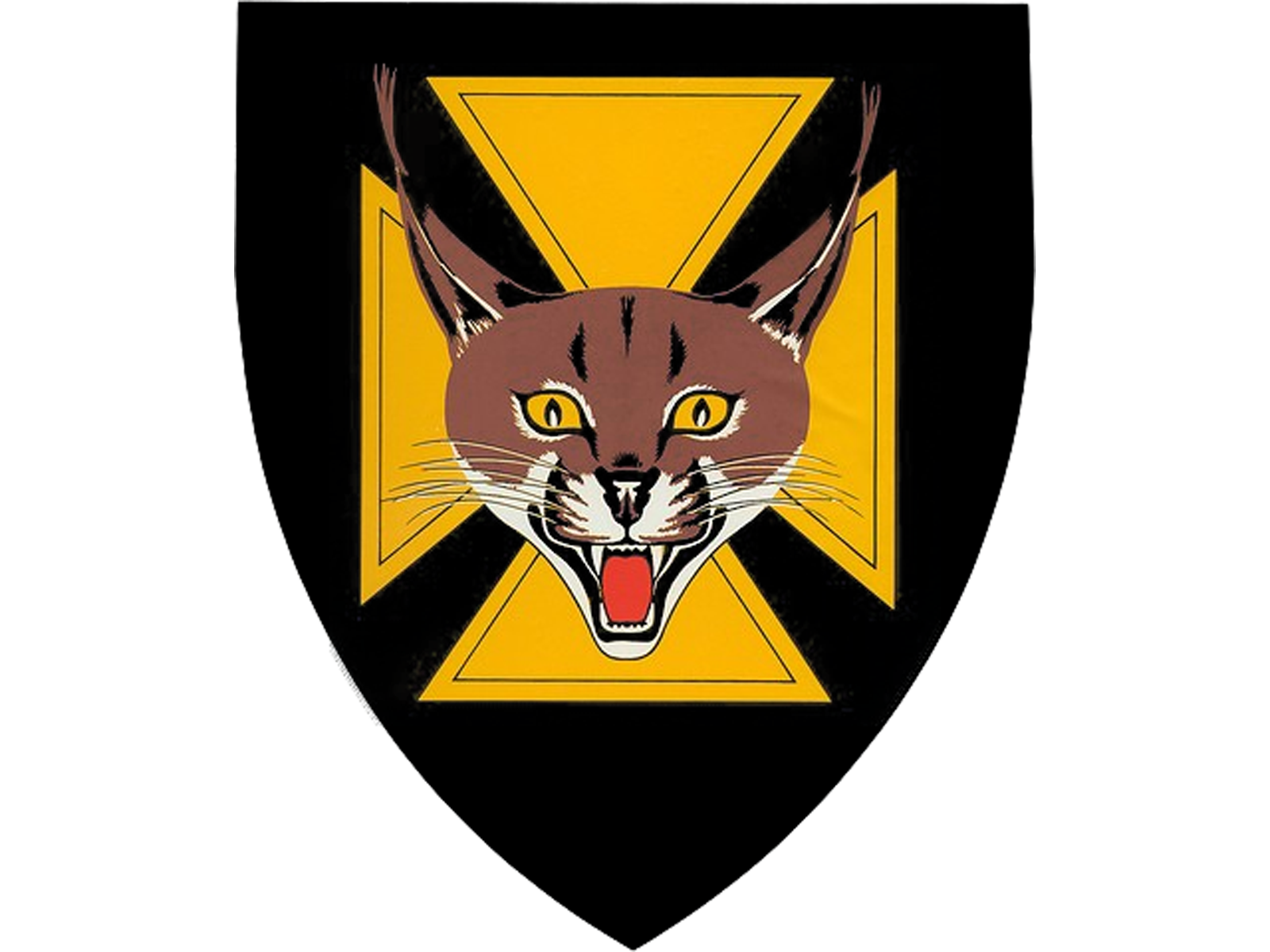
- 7 SAI Emblem
- Active: 1 October 1973 to present
- Country: South Africa
- Branch: South African Army
- Type: Motorised infantry
- Part of: South African Infantry Formation
- Garrison/HQ: Phalaborwa, Limpopo
- Motto: Tenacuter (Perseverance)

Commanders
- First Commanding Officer: Commandant Eddie Webb

Insignia
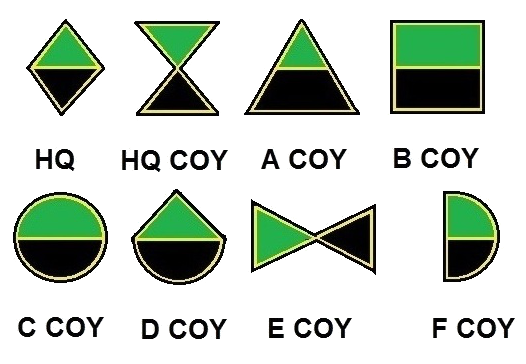
- Company level insignia

- SA Motorised Infantry beret bar circa 1992: SA Motorised Infantry beret bar

7 South African Infantry Battalion is a motorised infantry unit of the South African Army.

== History ==
=== Origin ===
1973: 7 SAI was established on 1 October, at Bourke's Luck, Eastern Transvaal (now Mpumalanga) by Commandant Eddie Webb. 1974: The first national servicemen began training in 1974.

1980: 7 SAI is relocated to Phalaborwa in the eastern part of the province of Limpopo.

=== Angola Bush War Deployment ===
1983: The July intake's training phase was shortened to accommodate a need to deploy a company for Operation Askari and Sector 10. The company would deploy with 101 Battalion in a reaction force role.

1984: Alpha Company was stationed at Rundu for Reaction Force duties under the command of 202 Battalion for 6 months, whereafter they were posted to Nepara for a further 6-month deployment. After a period of leave, they were posted back to Nepara for a third time, spending their 40th celebration on the 17/30 cutline in a fox camp (BF). Members of this company eventually joined the 905/6 Reaction Force duties. Bravo Company was also involved in operations to capture SWAPO radio operators using two modified Ratels fitted with radio direction-finding equipment named "Pointer" and "Spotter".

1987: August intake of 7 SAI's Alpha Company, was deployed to the operational area of Cuito Cuanavale, Angola, in 1988 under the command of a Captain G.P. Butler. Alpha Company consisted of five infantry platoons as well as an 81 mm mortar platoon and was deployed to the eastern side of the Cuito River (a tributary of the Okavango River) for a period of one month. During this time of deployment, various platoons were allocated as mechanised infantry (in Ratels) while the remainder formed a base camp sending out roving patrols in the area.

After a month of deployment in Angola, the peace accords were signed and Alpha Company returned to a base camp in Rundu, South West Africa.

=== South West Africa / Namibia ===
1989: during the UNTAG deployment in South West Africa/Namibia, Alpha Company provided base defence for the town of Oshakati with some of its platoons participating in the various counter insurgency operations against the PLAN infiltration that occurred during this time.

=== Post Apartheid ===
7 SAI changed from a training unit to a rear area protection unit when 113 Battalion became part of the unit.

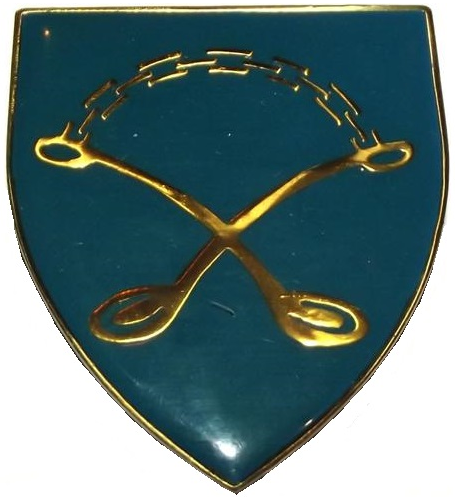
113 Battalion which was merged with 7 SAI

1994: 7 SAI became part of the Rapid Deployment Force during November.

==== Lesotho intervention ====
1998: 7 SAI took part in Operation Boleas in Lesotho to restore order after a botched army coup.

==== Burundi ====
2002: 7 SAI took part in the UN/AU peace mission, Operation Fibre to restore stability in Burundi.

==== Under the Infantry Formation ====
2002: 7 SAI was placed under the command of the South African Army Infantry Formation as a motorised infantry unit.

The SANDF's Motorised Infantry is transported mostly by SAMIL Trucks, Mamba APC's, or other unprotected motor vehicles. Samil 20, 50, and 100 trucks transport soldiers, towing guns, and carrying equipment and supplies. Samil trucks are all-wheel drive, in order to have vehicles that function reliably in extremes of weather and terrain. Motorised infantry have an advantage in mobility, allowing them to move to critical sectors of the battlefield faster, allowing better response to enemy movements, as well as the ability to outmaneuver the enemy.

== Insignia ==
The unit's emblem is a rooikat superimposed on a Maltese cross, which is in memory of two gold crosses commissioned by the ZAR President TF Burgers and presented to two Bourke-Luck ladies for their help in caring for and nursing wounded Boer commandos during the Sekhukhune War.

=== Previous dress insignia ===
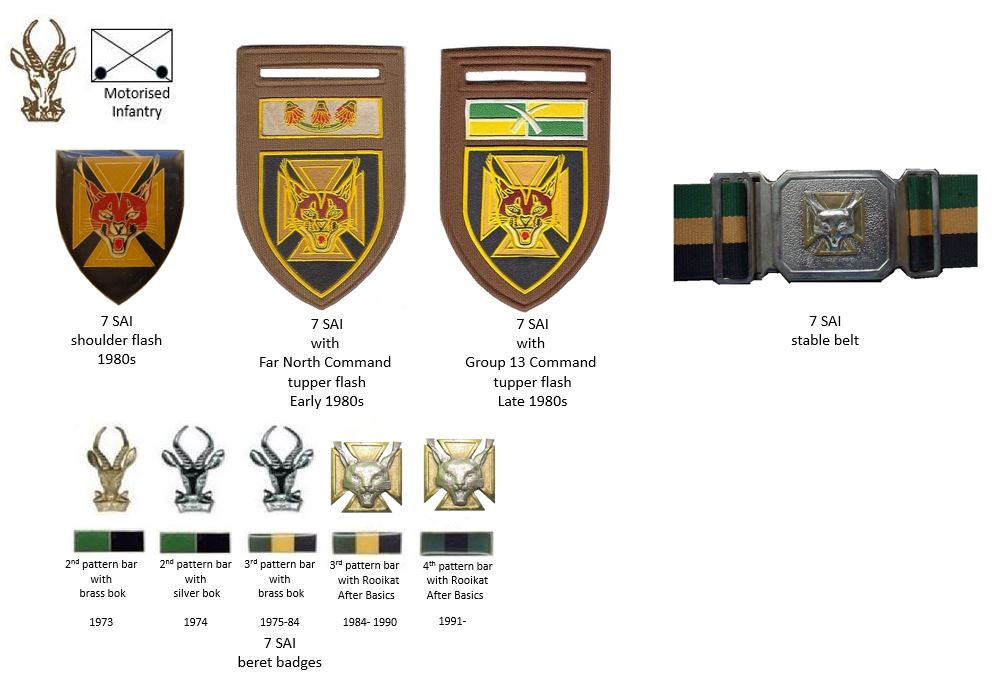
SADF era 7 SAI insignia

=== Current dress insignia ===
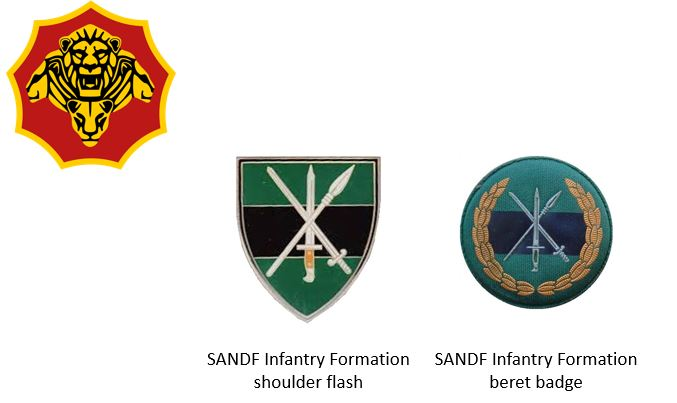
SANDF era Infantry Formation insignia

== Leadership ==
Leadership
From	Honorary Colonel	To	Ribbon
	No known incumbents		
From	Commanding Officer	To	Ribbon
October 1973	Cmdt Eddie Webb (Note: Later Brigadier General)	December 1974	
January 1975	Cmdt J. van Niekerk (Note: Later Colonel)	May 1977	
June 1977	Cmdt J.F. Gouws	December 1978	
January 1979	Cmdt H.J. Schultz	December 1981	
January 1982	Cmdt W. Swanepoel	January 1988	
January 1988	Cmdt J.E. Rabe	April 1988	
May 1988	Cmdt J.M.P. Wessels	n.d.	
n.d.	Cmdt Werner Sott	n.d.	
1994	Lt Col Daan Van Der Merwe	1997	
n.d.	Lt Col Barnard	n.d.	
n.d.	Lt Col Tjaart Van Der Walt	n.d.	
2005	Lt Col Mabotja	n.d.	
2009	Lt Col Khathutshelo Nethononda	n.d.	
2013	Lt Col Andrew Matlaila	n.d.	
2017	Lt Col Tilsetso Sekgobela	n.d.	
From	Regimental Sergeants Major	To	Ribbon
October 1973	WO1 V. Coleman	December 1974	
January 1975	WO1 A.J. Hattingh	December 1977	
January 1978	WO1 J.H. Mileham	December 1979	
January 1980	WO1 J.F. Somers PMM	December 1982	Pro Merito Medal PMM
January 1983	WO1 J.H. Steenekamp HC,PMM	November 1986	Honoris Crux (1975) HC Pro Merito Medal PMM
December 1986	WO1 J.J. Pretorius	July 1988	
December 1989	WO1 L. Brooke MMM,JCD	July 1994	Military Merit Medal MMM John Chard Decoration JCD
August 1988	WO1 J.J. Quintin Lategan MMM	n.d.	Military Merit Medal MMM
n.d.	WO1 James Blom	n.d.	
1 January 1994	WO1 Dirk Prins	January 1999	
n.d.	WO1 Chinainai	n.d.	
n.d.	WO1 Jr Raath	n.d.	
