= Waterberg Commando =

Light infantry regiment of the South African Army

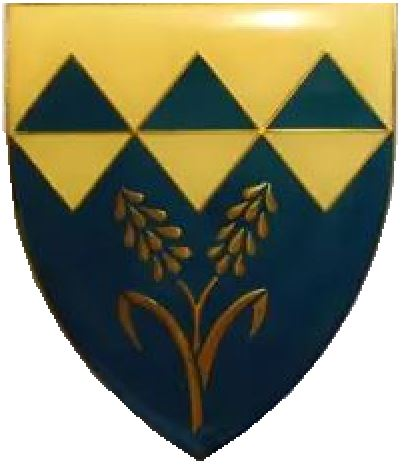
- Waterberg Commando emblem
- Active: 1890-
- Country: South Africa
- Allegiance: (South African Republic) Zuid Afrikaanse Republiek; Union of South Africa; Republic of South Africa; Republic of South Africa
- Branch: South African Army; South African Army
- Type: Infantry
- Role: Light Infantry
- Size: One Battalion
- Part of: South African Infantry Corps; Army Territorial Reserve, Group 14 and later Group 29
- Garrison/HQ: Modimolle (Nylstroom)

Waterberg Commando was a light infantry regiment of the South African Army. It formed part of the South African Army Infantry Formation as well as the South African Territorial Reserve.

== History ==
=== Origin ===
This unit can trace its origins to just before the Anglo Boer War as the Transvaal Republic became more nervous of its British adversaries in Bechaunaland and Rhodesia.

=== Operations ===
==== With the Zuid Afrikaanse Republiek ====
The Waterberg Commando gathered at Nylstroom on 11 October 1899. After receiving news of the outbreak of war, this Commando proceeded to the confluence of the Limpopo and Palala rivers to join with the Soutpansberg Commando, cross into Bechaunaland and destroy railway infrastructure.

==== With the UDF ====
By 1902 all Commando remnants were under British military control and disarmed.

By 1912, however previous Commando members could join shooting associations.

By 1940, such commandos were under control of the National Reserve of Volunteers.

These commandos were formally reactivated by 1948.

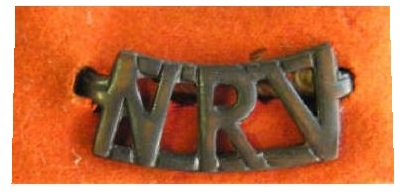
UDF era National Reserve of Volunteers shoulder tab

==== With the SADF ====
During this era, the unit was mainly engaged in area force protection, search and cordones as well as stock theft control assistance to the rural police.

The unit resorted under the command of Group 14.

Waterberg Commando had a branch in Ellisras which became a fully functional unit and was called the Waterberg North was eventually renamed the Magdol Commando around 1972.

==== With the SANDF ====
===== Disbandment =====
This unit, along with all other Commando units was disbanded after a decision by South African President Thabo Mbeki to disband all Commando Units. The Commando system was phased out between 2003 and 2008 "because of the role it played in the apartheid era", according to the Minister of Safety and Security Charles Nqakula.

== Unit Insignia ==
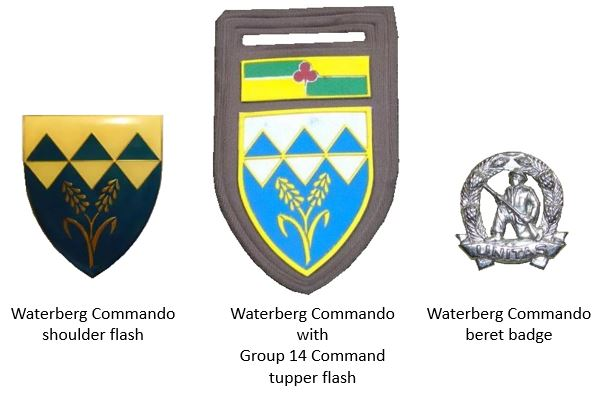
SADF era Waterberg Commando insignia

== See also ==
- South African Commando System
