= Soutpansberg Military Area =

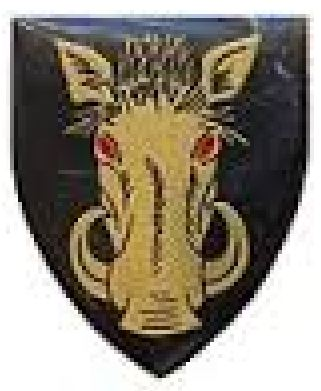
- Soutpansberg Military Area emblem
- Disbanded: 2008
- Country: South Africa
- Allegiance: South Africa
- Branch: South African Army
- Type: Militarised Area
- Part of: Chief of the Army
- Garrison/HQ: Messina, Northern Province
- Engagements: South African Border War

Insignia
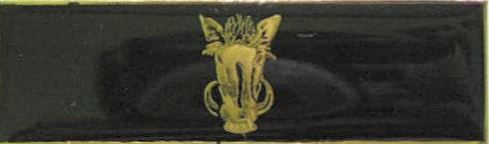
- Soutpansberg Military Area Command Bar

The Soutpansberg Military Area (SMA) Headquarters was situated in Messina in the Northern Province of South Africa. The size of the area for which the SMA was responsible for was approximately 4,040 square kilometres (1,560 sq mi).

== History ==
After the independence of Zimbabwe and its subsequent close relations with liberation organisations in South Africa, a security threat from the north was expected. A militarised zone known as the Soutpansberg Military Area was therefore effected and bordered two international borders, those of Botswana and Zimbabwe. The length of borderline for which the Military Area was responsible was approximately 74 kilometres (46 mi) shared with Botswana and approximately 225 kilometres (140 mi) shared with Zimbabwe.

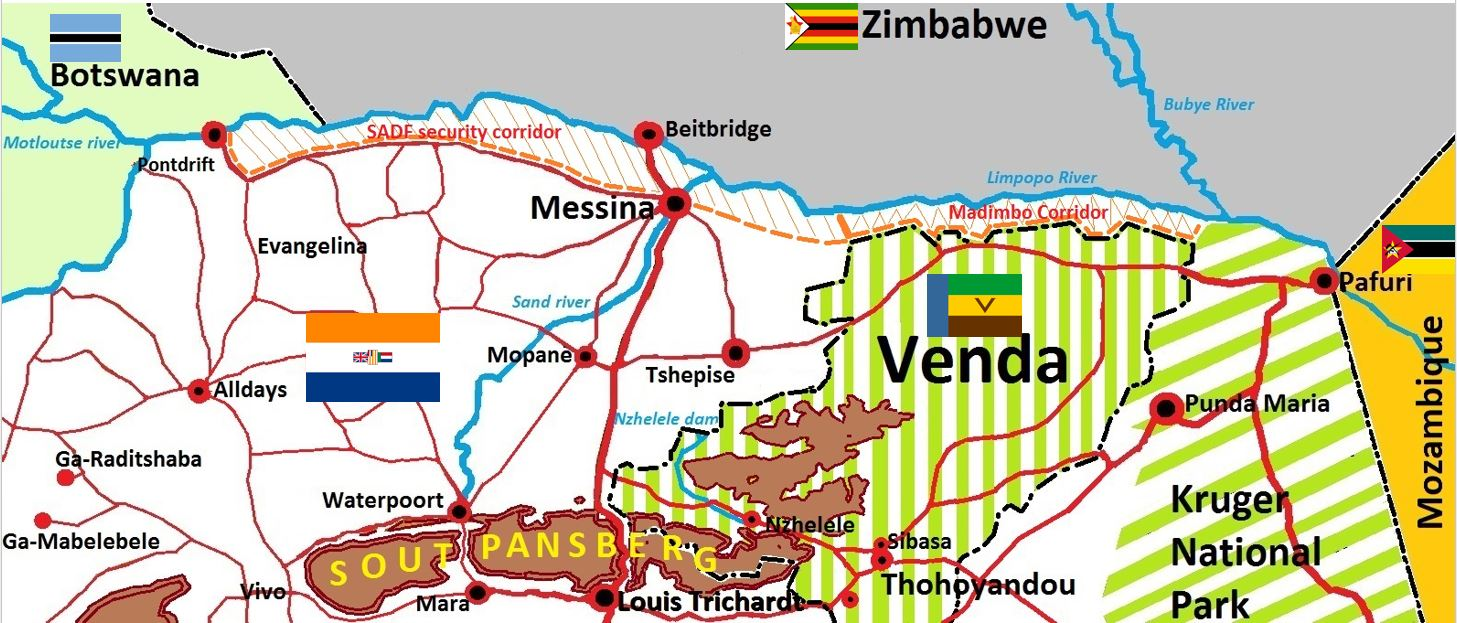
SADF Soutpansberg Military Area, showing military security zones

Some parts of the affected area allowed commercial farmers to continue to operate, while others areas, particularly to the east of Messina, were depopulated and became a military exclusive zone called the Madimbo Corridor.

=== Barriers ===
Along the borderline with Zimbabwe, starting at the Sand River just east of Messina up to the Alldays area, a Norex electrical fence marked the borderline. There was a gap of approximately 32 kilometres in the Norex fence at the Vhembe area. The Norex fence was manned by military personnel from the Military Area who were stationed at substations every ten kilometres along the border. One to two soldiers were deployed at each substation.

When interference occurred on the fence, which was set on alarm mode, it would register at the substation closest to the interference, at the Military Area headquarters, as well as at the offices of the contractor responsible for the maintenance of the electrical fence. The electrical fence was severely damaged during the 2000 floods and was under repair, placing an extra burden on funds and personnel to maintain the same level of readiness.

The rest of the borderline east of the Sand River follows the Limpopo River, and consists mainly of farmland. In this area, sisal plants formed a barrier in the past, but these were cleared to make way for an extension of the Norex electrical fence. However, the fence was never erected because funds were not made available to do so. The sisal barrier was also very badly damaged by elephants and monkeys eating the plants. It is debatable whether the sisal ‘fence’ was ever really effective. Farmers along this stretch of the border assisted the military and the police in reporting suspected crossings and illegal immigrants in their areas.

=== Units in the Military Area ===
==== Command ====
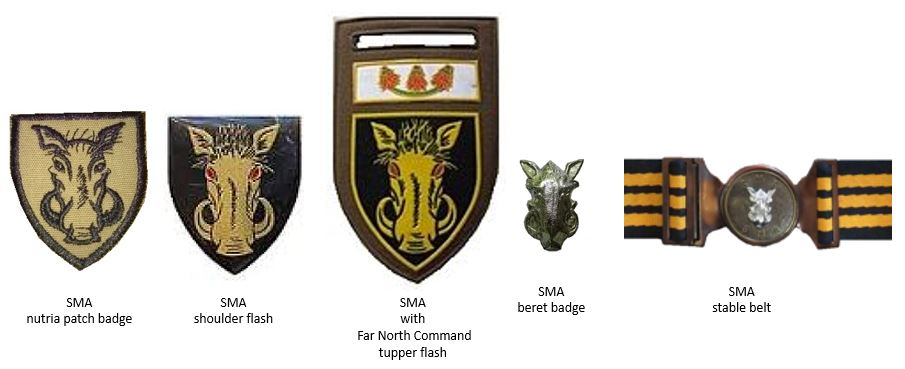
SADF era Soutpansberg Military Area insignia

==== Conventional Forces in the SMA ====
Elements of 32 Battalion were used in the Military Area after they arrived from South West Africa. A Northern Sotho specific Infantry, 116 Battalion was based in Messina.

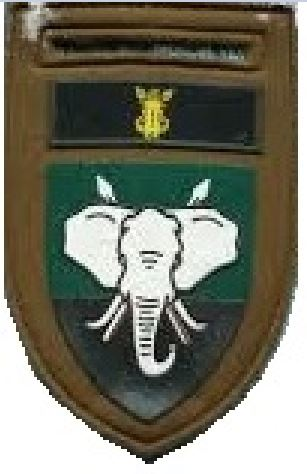
SADF 15 SAI in the Soutpansberg Military Area

SADF 32 Battalion (elements)

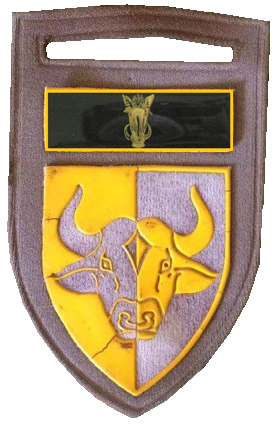
SADF 116 Battalion in the Soutpansberg Military Area

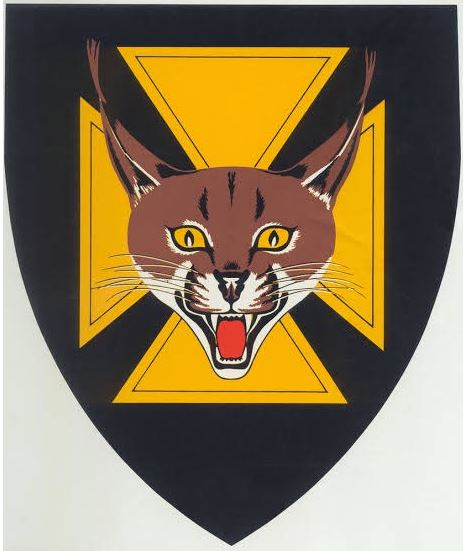
SADF 7 SAI Battalion

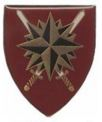
SADF Special Forces

===== Special Service Companies for Quick Reaction =====
The SMA, similar to the SWATF approach, also activated an immediate reaction force (Special Service Company) to deal with any attack and was primarily infantry company strength and fully motorised.

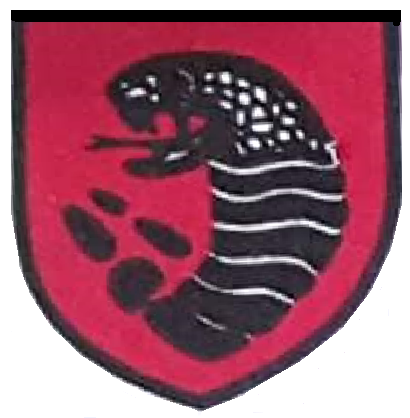
116 Battalion 907 Special Service Company

907 Special Service Company was formed from 116 Battalion's Bravo Company at Spence Shaft in 1986. 907 SSC was based at Madimbo and deployed on Buffels but converted to Casspirs later.

==== Citizen Commando Units in the SMA ====
Various commando units such as Limpopo Commando and the Soutpansberg Commando were also based in the Military Area, just outside Messina and was responsible for border protection. Limpopo Commando was responsible for the stretch from Pontdrift East up to the nature reserve west of Messina.

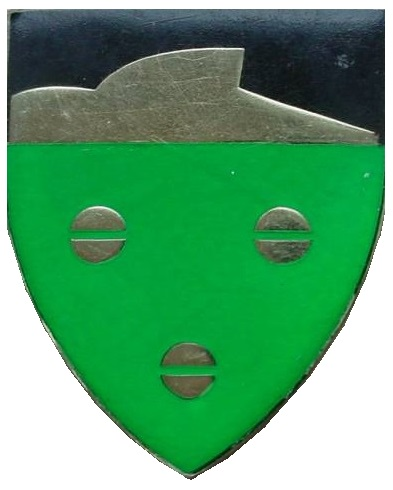
SADF Soutpansberg Commando

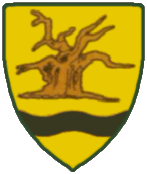
SADF Limpopo Commando

=== The SMA replaced by Operation Corona ===
Border safeguarding was redesigned out under Operation Corona when the SANDF resumed these duties from the Police. Phase one of the border safeguarding initiative witnessed deployments on the South Africa/Zimbabwe borderline.

Phase two saw the SANDF deploy on the Zimbabwe, Mozambique, Swaziland and Lesotho borders, with two sub-units to Limpopo (Pontdrift and Musina), two sub-units to Mpumalanga (Macadamia and Skukuza), two sub-units to Kwa-Zulu- Natal (Ndumo and Pongola) and one sub-unit to the Free State (Ladybrand).

Phase three also focused on these borders. By 2013, the Lesotho/Free State border was covered, followed by the Lesotho/KwaZulu-Natal border by 2014.
