= Motorized infantry =

Infantry transported by motor vehicles

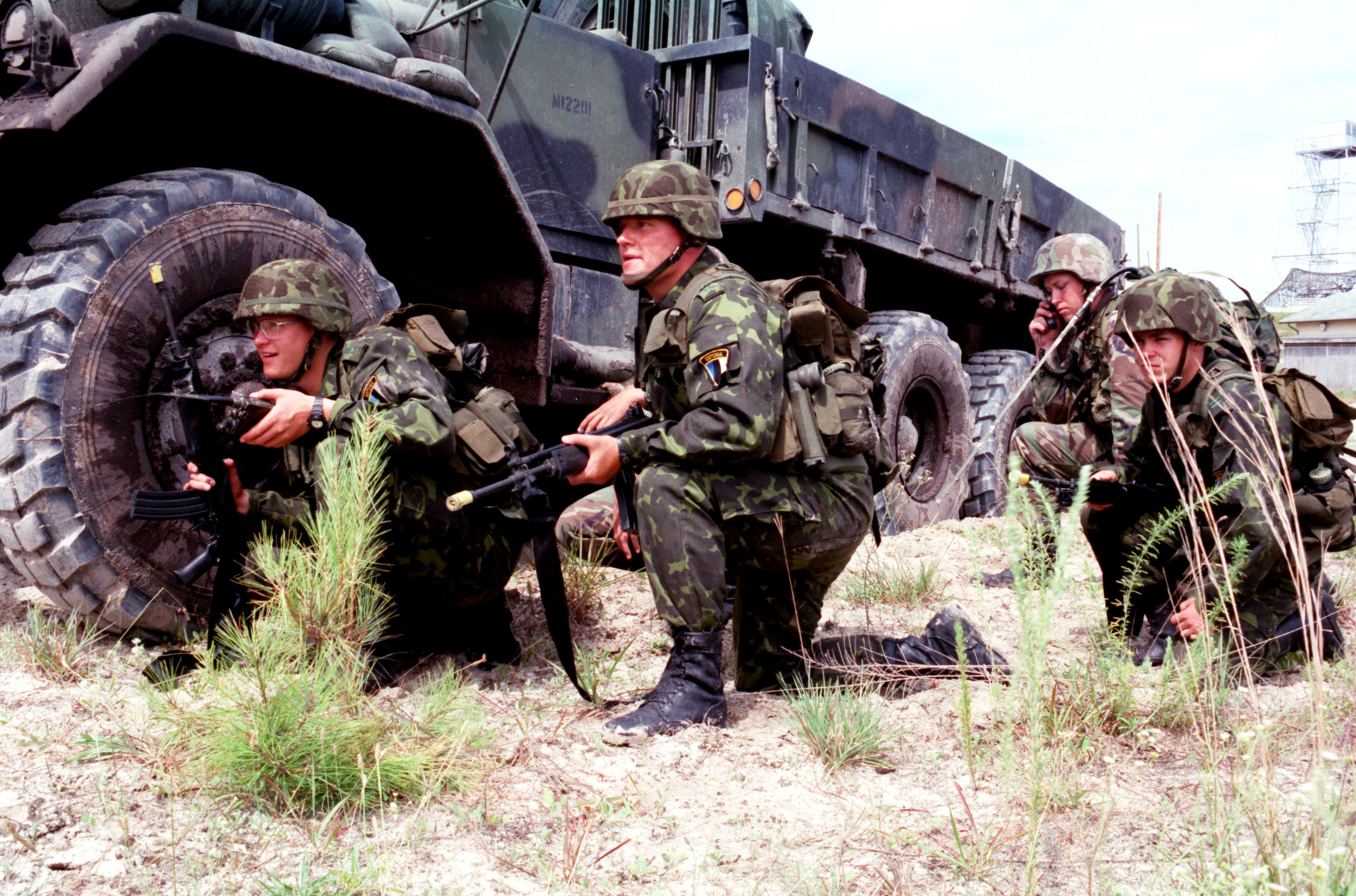
Estonian Land Forces motorized infantry during a training exercise in the United States (1998)

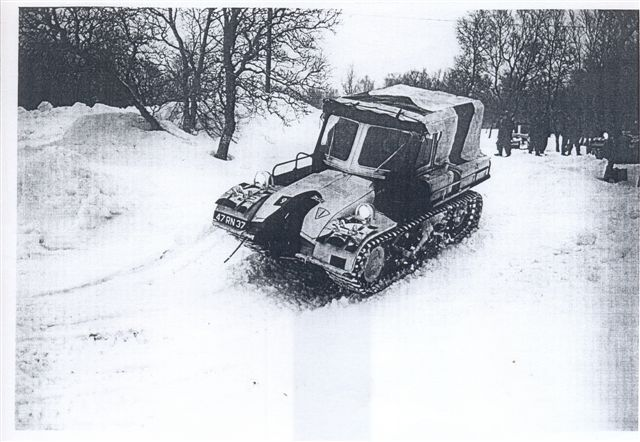
A Royal Marines snowmobile on patrol in Norway (1975)

Motorized infantry is infantry that is transported by trucks or other motor vehicles. It is distinguished from mechanized infantry, which is carried in armoured personnel carriers or infantry fighting vehicles, and from light infantry, which can typically operate independently from supporting elements and vehicles for relatively long periods and may be airborne.

== Operations ==
As defined by the United States Army, motorization is "the use of unarmored wheeled vehicles for the transportation of combat units." Motorizing infantry is the first stage towards the mechanization of an army. Civilian trucks are often readily adaptable to military uses of transporting soldiers, towing guns, and carrying equipment and supplies. Motorization greatly increases the strategic mobility of infantry units, which would otherwise rely on marches or railroads. In practice, armies have found it advantageous to develop trucks to military specifications, such as all-wheel drive, to have vehicles that function reliably in extremes of weather and terrain.

Motorization provides no direct tactical advantage in small-unit combat, as trucks and light utility vehicles are vulnerable to artillery and small arms fire. However, in larger battles, motorized infantry has an advantage in mobility allowing them to move to critical sectors of the battlefield faster, allowing better response to enemy movements, and the ability to outmaneuver the enemy.

The disadvantage of motorization is that fuel is critical; if motorized divisions run out of fuel, they may be required to abandon their vehicles.

== History ==
The First World War was the first major war to see use of petroleum-powered vehicles used to transport supplies and personnel, and to fight the enemy. Unarmored and armored cars were dispatched to attack enemy positions and trains, and were used to patrol the front. However, this was on a small scale and a majority of movement was on foot and logistics with trains and horse-drawn logistics.

The Pancho Villa Expedition was a notable use of the armored car by the United States Cavalry under the command of General Pershing. There a Lieutenant George S. Patton was introduced to mechanized warfare when he led a small group of men against Villa's forces at San Miguelito Ranch.

After the war, the major militaries of the world saw the great benefit that motorized vehicles could have on the logistics and combat effectiveness of their infantry units.

In the 1920s, the British created the Experimental Mechanized Force between the wars to test the capabilities of all-arms formations of mechanized units, this included motorized infantry ("Motor Battalions").

The speed advantages of motorized infantry first became important in World War II in the German Blitzkrieg. While it was no more robust than the regular infantry that moved on foot, its increased speed became decisive in the Blitzkrieg strategy, as it could follow the panzer forces and defend its flanks.

Notwithstanding the obvious advantages of motorization, most countries opted for only partial motorization of their infantry because of the cost and logistical implications caused by the deployment of so many vehicles. Even large armies were affected by such factors. The motorization of armies required massive industrialization of the economies in order to meet the heavy cost for vehicle production, replacement parts, and fueling.

The bulk of German and Soviet infantry remained on foot. While some units of the Wehrmacht, such as its armored divisions, were highly mechanized, most of the army was still using horses due to its inconsistent oil supply.

US infantry divisions were able to motorize a major portion of their infantry due to their industrial base. Likewise, infantry divisions of the British Empire could motorize chosen subordinate units, but infantry usually advanced on foot.

After WW2, most armies completely motorized and partially mechanized their infantry. The engineering improvements throughout the 20th century allowed for increasingly bigger vehicles to be deployed.

In Russia and the former Soviet Union, the term motostrelki (мотострелки in Cyrillic) is used to indicate mechanized infantry; that term was used in some Warsaw Pact countries. These "motor rifle" divisions were mostly mechanized but had a core of motorized infantry with them. In practice, this meant that the infantry of the Soviet and Russian "tank" divisions rode in fully tracked BMP vehicles, while those in "motor rifle" divisions were equipped with wheeled BTR vehicles.

== Present day ==
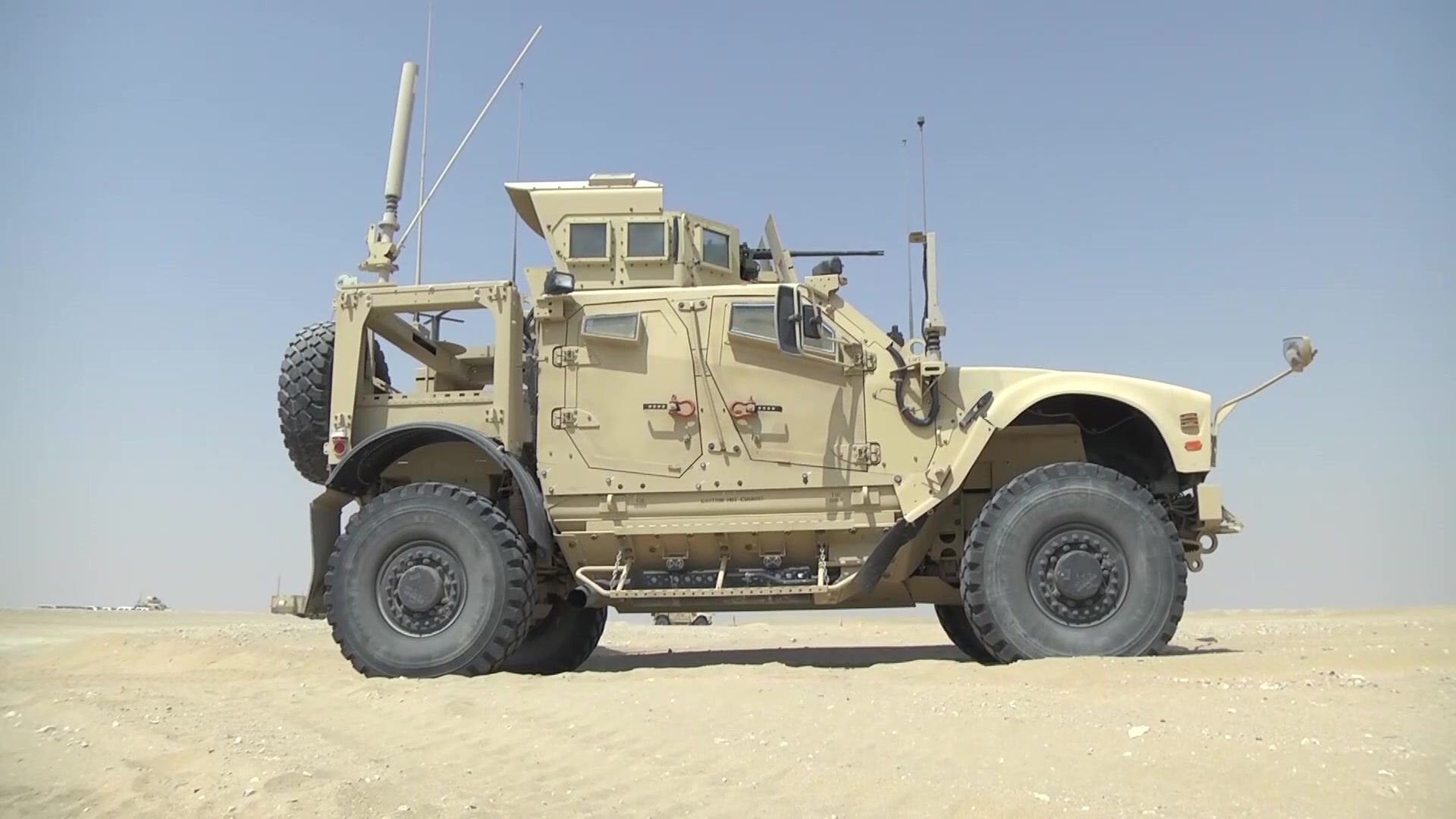
An M-ATV in Camp Buehring, Kuwait in a live fire exercise on 30 August 2017.

After the Vietnam War, the US military saw the need for light squad based transportation. This project became the Humvee which was used extensively by the Army and Marine Corps in the Gulf War, Early War in Afghanistan, and Early Iraq War. The latter two conflicts resulted in a large scale insurgency and saw the increase in use of IEDs. This soon became the largest source of casualties to NATO forces. The result was a shift away from lightly armored vehicles to more mechanized vehicles or more heavily armored MRAPs. During the duration of the Humvee's use in Iraq and Afghanistan and before the roll-out of MRAPs, it slowly became more heavily armored with larger turret shields, bulletproof glass and extra plating on its doors and components. Less armored but faster and lighter MRAPs were developed under the Joint Light Tactical Vehicle program, which is now phase in the Oshkosh L-ATV and M-ATV. It has been described as "the first vehicle purpose-built for modern battlefield-networks". These vehicles have seen deployments in Rojava, Syria in Operation Inherent Resolve.

For transportation outside of combat, the US military fields a variety of trucks including the Medium Tactical Vehicles replacement for the Marine Corps and the Family of Medium Tactical Vehicles for the Army. The National Guard and other reserve units also field older models such as the M939 5-ton 6x6.

Beginning at the end of the late 1970's with the Toyota War, large numbers of gun trucks and technicals came to be increasingly used in many insurgent and proxy conflicts around the world. This involved the use of impressed or purchased civilian vehicles, hastily fitted with various weapons, or simply used as combat transports. These vehicles quickly grew in influence among many armies with low budgets, but a need to quickly move across large swaths of territory.

== See also ==
- Infantry mobility vehicle
- Dragoon
- Mounted infantry
- Tank desant
