= Motor Rifle Troops (Soviet Union) =

Motorized infantry arm of the Soviet Army Ground Forces

Motor Rifle Troops of the USSR
- Мотострелковые войска СССР
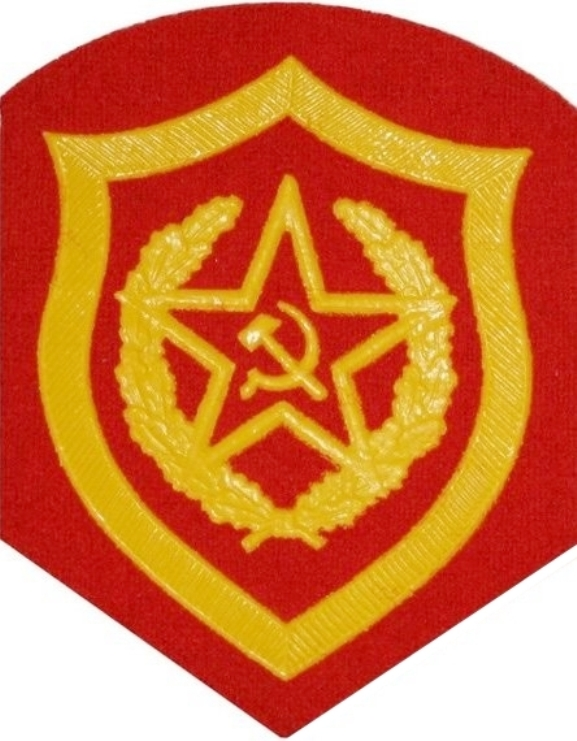
- Patch with the emblem of the motor rifle troops
- Active: 1957–1991
- Country: Soviet Union
- Allegiance: Soviet Armed Forces
- Branch: Ground Forces
- Type: Infantry
- Role: Mechanised infantry
- Equipment: BTR, BMP

Motor Rifle Troops of the USSR (Russian: Мотострелковые войска СССР) was the motorized infantry arm of the Army Ground Forces of the Soviet Union during the Cold War. They were mechanised infantry formations using combined arms doctrine, based around infantry operating closely with armoured personnel carriers and infantry fighting vehicles, aided by organic armour and artillery.

== History ==
On the 9 July 1945, a decree of the State Defence Committee No. GKO-9488ss, "On the Replenishment of Armoured and Mechanised Troops of the Red Army" was issued. It ordered the creation of mechanised divisions from existing rifle, cavalry, and airborne divisions, under the control of the Armoured and Mechanised branch.

The Soviet motor rifle troops officially appeared in accordance with the Directive of the Minister of Defence of the USSR No. org. / 3/62540 of the 27th of February 1957. Under this directive, all rifle divisions and part of the mechanised divisions would be reorganised into motor rifles.

== Doctrine ==
The main force of the post-war Soviet ground forces was split into Tank Divisions and Motor Rifle Divisions. Whereas Tank Divisions were designed for rapid breakthrough and exploitation, Motor Rifle divisions were designed for areas unsuitable for tanks, and attacking heavily fortified positions. Because of their high mobility, the motor rifle divisions could keep pace with the tank divisions.

Motor rifles were the largest branch of troops in the USSR Armed Forces. By the middle of the 1980s, they made up around three-quarters of the strength of Soviet manoeuvre divisions.

Soviet doctrine stressed the importance of combined arms, with all branches of forces working together at every level. This was reflected in the design of the motor rifle formations, with organic tank and artillery formations at the regimental level, down to the cooperation between infantry squads and their vehicles.

=== Offensive ===
On the attack, a Soviet motor rifle formation would use its advantage in mobility to manoeuvre around and exploit an enemy defensive position, and carry out the attack with overwhelming concentration of firepower and forces. Motor rifles typically deployed in echelons. The first echelon was the main attacking force, tasked with achieving the primary objectives, and the second echelon was to follow on from the first, passing through or bypassing them, and achieve any further objectives.

=== Defensive ===
In the defensive, Soviet motor rifles also employed fire and manoeuvre, and emphasised a flexible defence in depth.

== Equipment ==
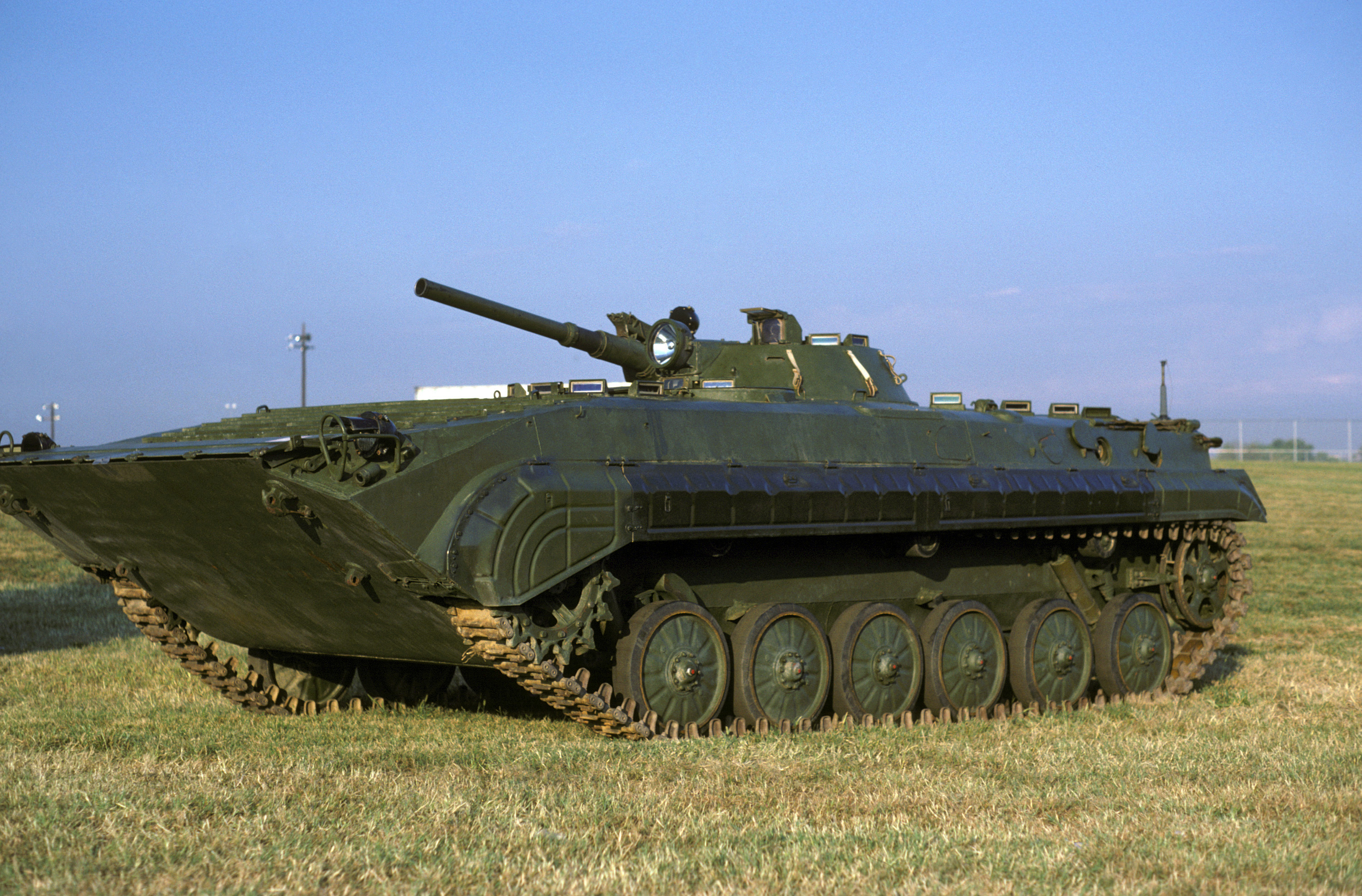
BMP-1 IFV

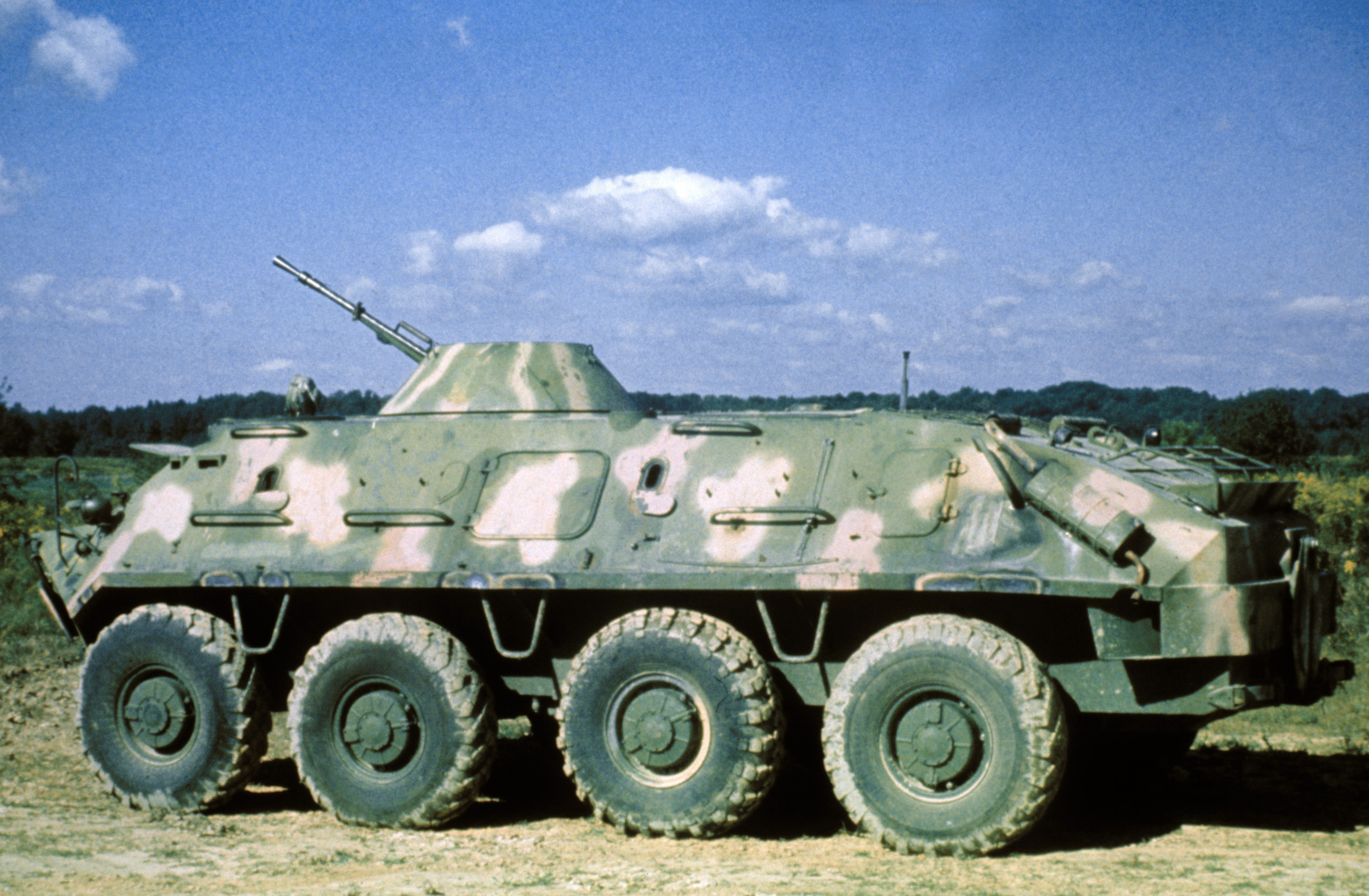
BTR-60PB APC

Soviet motor rifle infantry were mounted in a mixture of wheeled BTR series armoured personnel carriers (APCs) and tracked BMP series infantry fighting vehicles (IFVs), with a typical division having two infantry regiments mounted in BTRs, and one in BMPs.

Both the BTR and BMP were amphibious and had CBRN defence, allowing for rapid strategic movement across water rivers, and contaminated areas in a nuclear battlefield.

== Organisation ==
The largest organisational unit for the motor rifles in the Soviet Army was the division.

=== Motor Rifle Division ===
A Motor Rifle Division was organised as follows:

Soviet Motor Rifle Division 1980s

- Motor Rifle Division
  - Division Headquarters
  - Regimental
    - Motor Rifle Regiment (BMP)
    - Motor Rifle Regiment (BTR)
    - Motor Rifle Regiment (BTR)
    - Tank Regiment
    - Artillery Regiment
    - SAM Regiment
  - Battalion
    - SSM Battalion
    - Antitank Battalion
    - Reconnaissance Battalion
    - Engineer Battalion
    - Signal Battalion
    - Materiel Support Battalion
  - Company and Below
    - Maintenance Company
    - Chemical Protection Company
    - Medical Company
    - Artillery Command Battery
    - Helicopter Squadron (Not every MRD)
    - Other Support Elements

=== Motor Rifle Regiment ===
Soviet Motor Rifle Regiment 1980s

A Motor Rifle Division contains three motor rifle regiments, with infantry mounted in either BTR or BMP.

- Regimental
  - Regimental Headquarters
  - Battalion
    - Motor Rifle Battalion
    - Motor Rifle Battalion
    - Motor Rifle Battalion
    - Tank Battalion
    - Artillery Battalion/Detachment
    - SAM Battalion
  - Company/Battery
    - Artillery Battery
    - Anti-Tank Vehicle Battery
    - Anti-Aircraft Battery
    - Reconnaissance Company
    - Engineering Company
    - Medical Company
    - Transportation Company
    - Signals Company
    - Maintenance Company
    - Services Company
    - Chemical Defence Company

=== Motor Rifle Battalion ===
The Motor Rifle Battalion was the basic building block of the division, as it was the lowest level containing its own organic mortar, signals, Anti-Aircraft, Anti-Tank, and support elements. There were three motor rifle battalions per regiment.

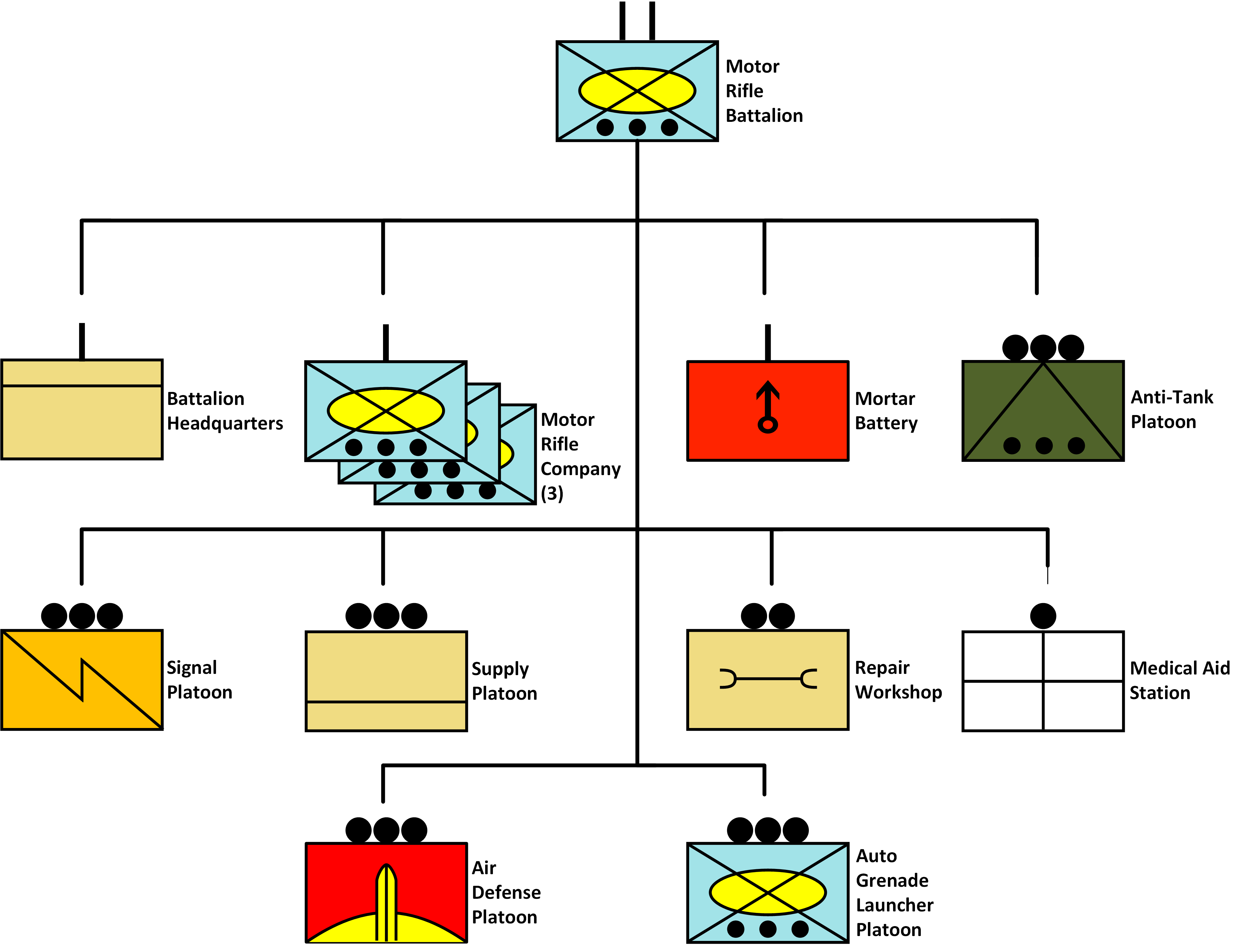
Soviet Motor Rifle Battalion 1980s

- Motor Rifle Battalion
  - Battalion Headquarters
  - Company
    - Motor Rifle Company
    - Motor Rifle Company
    - Motor Rifle Company
    - 120mm Mortar Battery
  - Platoon
    - Anti-Tank Platoon
    - Signal Platoon
    - Supply and Services Platoon
  - Section
    - Medical Section

=== Motor Rifle Company ===
Each rifle squad was mounted in one BMP or BTR depending on the equipment of the regiment.

- Motor Rifle Company
  - Headquarters Element
  - Motor Rifle Platoon
    - BTR/BMP Mounted Rifle Squad
    - BTR/BMP Mounted Rifle Squad
    - BTR/BMP Mounted Rifle Squad
  - Motor Rifle Platoon
    - BTR/BMP Mounted Rifle Squad
    - BTR/BMP Mounted Rifle Squad
    - BTR/BMP Mounted Rifle Squad
  - Motor Rifle Platoon
    - BTR/BMP Mounted Rifle Squad
    - BTR/BMP Mounted Rifle Squad
    - BTR/BMP Mounted Rifle Squad
