= Regiment =

Military unit

Standard NATO symbol for a regiment of several battalions, indicated by the III. The shape, colour and pattern indicate friendly infantry.

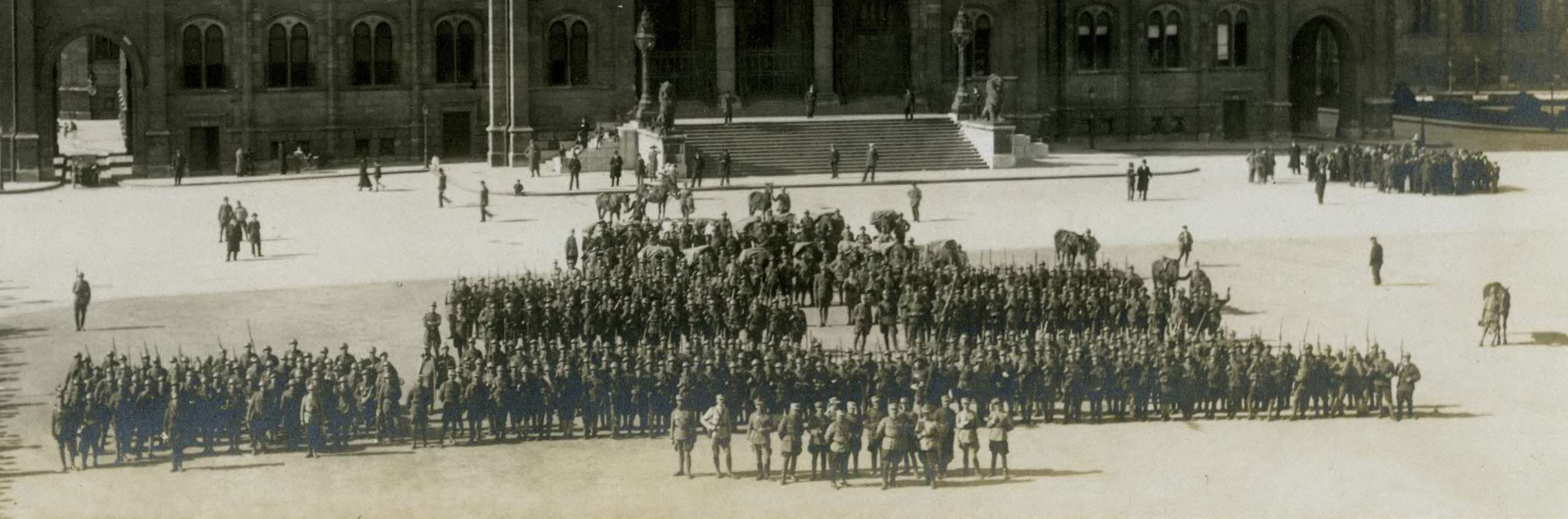
Romanian 27th Infantry Regiment in front of the Hungarian Parliament in 1919

A regiment is a military unit. Its role and size varies markedly, depending on the country, service, or specialisation.

In Medieval Europe, the term regiment denoted any large body of front-line soldiers, recruited or conscripted in one geographical area, by a leader who was often also the feudal lord in capite of the soldiers. Lesser barons of knightly rank could be expected to muster or hire a company or battalion from their manorial estate.

By the end of the 17th century, infantry regiments in most European armies were permanent units, with approximately 800 men and commanded by a colonel.

== Definitions ==
During the modern era, the word "regiment" – much like "corps" – may have two somewhat divergent meanings, which refer to two distinct roles:

1. a front-line military formation; or
2. an administrative or ceremonial unit.

In many armies, the first role has been assumed by independent battalions, battlegroups, task forces, brigades and other, similarly sized operational units. However, these non-regimental units tend to be short-lived; and regiments have tended to retain their traditional responsibilities for ceremonial duties, the recruitment of volunteers, induction of new recruits, individual morale and esprit de corps, and administrative roles (such as pay).

A regiment may consequently be a variety of sizes:

- smaller than a standard battalion, e.g. Household Cavalry Mounted Regiment;
- a battalion equivalent, e.g. 3rd Foreign Infantry Regiment;
- a brigade equivalent, e.g. 8th Marine Regiment (United States);
- several battalions, e.g.
  - 3rd U.S. Infantry Regiment (The Old Guard) and
  - Royal Regiment of Scotland; or
- an entire arm of service, e.g.
  - the Royal Australian Regiment includes all of the Australian Army's regular infantry (other than reserve and special forces units), and
  - the artillery units of the British Army are known collectively as the Royal Regiment of Artillery, which is sub-divided for operation purposes into field regiments.

== Historical origin ==
The French term régiment is considered to have entered military usage in Europe at the end of the 16th century, when armies evolved from collections of retinues who followed knights, to formally organised, permanent military forces. At that time, regiments were usually named after their commanding colonels, and disbanded at the end of the campaign or war; the colonel and his regiment might recruit from and serve several monarchs or countries. Later, it was customary to name the regiment by its precedence in the line of battle, and to recruit from specific places, called cantons. The oldest regiments which still exist, and their dates of establishment, include the French 1st Infantry Regiment (1479), the Spanish Infantry Regiment "Soria" No. 9 (1505), the Swedish Svea Life Guards (1521) and the British Honourable Artillery Company (1537).

In the 17th century, brigades were formed as units combining infantry, cavalry, and artillery that were more effective than the older, single-arms regiments; in many armies, brigades replaced regiments. Organisation and numbers did not follow any standardised pattern between or within armies during this period, with the only common factor being that each regiment had a single commander.

By the beginning of the 18th century, regiments in most European continental armies had evolved into permanent units with distinctive titles and uniforms, each under the command of a colonel. When at full strength, an infantry regiment normally comprised two field battalions of about 800 men each or 8–10 companies. In some armies, an independent regiment with fewer companies was labelled a demi-regiment. A cavalry regiment numbered 600 to 900 troopers, making up a single entity. On campaign, these numbers were soon reduced by casualties and detachments and it was sometimes necessary to amalgamate regiments or to withdraw them to a depot while recruits were obtained and trained.

With the widespread adoption of conscription in European armies during the nineteenth century, the regimental system underwent modification. By the end of the 19th century the number of battalions in an infantry regiment was: in France and Germany—3, in Russia—4 for field regiments and 2 for rifle and reserve regiments, in Austria—4; the number of squadrons in a cavalry regiment was: in France and Germany—5, in Russia and Austria—6 (with some exceptions). Prior to World War I, an infantry regiment in the French, German, Russian, and other smaller armies would comprise four battalions, each with a full strength on mobilization of about 1,000 men. As far as possible, the separate battalions would be garrisoned in the same military district, so that the regiment could be mobilized and campaign as a 4,000 strong linked group of sub-units. A cavalry regiment by contrast made up a single entity of up to 1,000 troopers. A notable exception to this practice was the British line infantry system where the two regular battalions constituting a regiment alternated between "home" and "foreign" service and seldom came together as a single unit.

== Regimental system ==
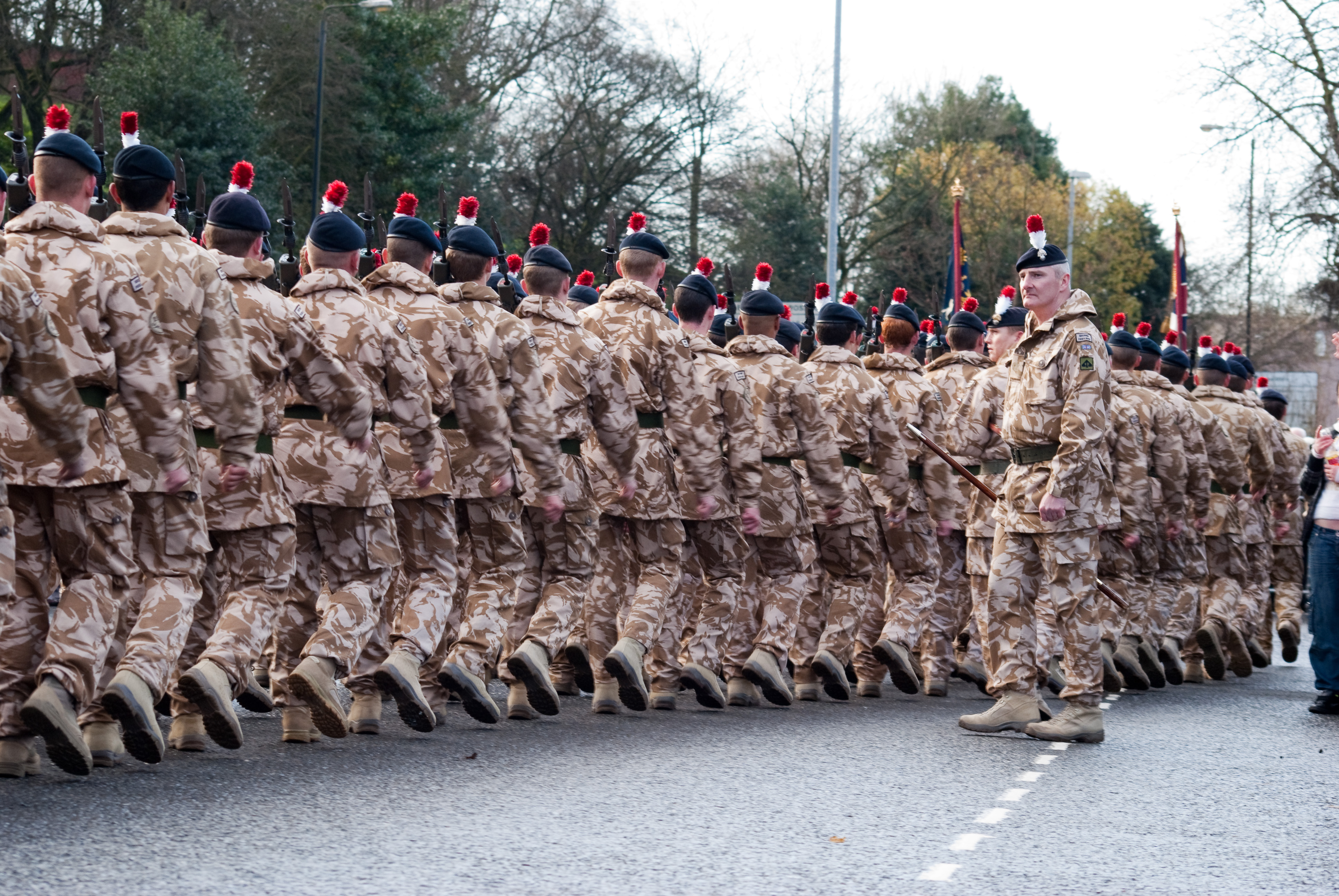
The Royal Regiment of Fusiliers on parade in England

In the regimental system, each regiment is responsible for recruiting, training, and administration; each regiment is permanently maintained and therefore the regiment will develop its unique esprit de corps because of its unitary history, traditions, recruitment, and function. Usually, the regiment is responsible for recruiting and administering all of a soldier's military career. Depending upon the country, regiments can be either combat units or administrative units or both.

This is often contrasted to the "continental system" adopted by many armies. In the continental system, the division is the functional army unit, and its commander is the administrator of every aspect of the formation: his staff train and administer the soldiers, officers, and commanders of the division's subordinate units. Generally, divisions are garrisoned together and share the same installations: thus, in divisional administration, a battalion commanding officer is just another officer in a chain of command. Soldiers and officers are transferred in and out of divisions as required.

Some regiments recruited from specific geographical areas, and usually incorporated the place name into the regimental name (e.g. Bangladesh Infantry Regiment). In other cases, regiments would recruit from a given age group within a nation (e.g. Zulu Impis), an ethnic group (e.g. the Gurkhas), or foreigners (e.g. the French Foreign Legion). In other cases, new regiments were raised for new functions within an army; e.g. the Fusiliers, the Parachute Regiment (British Army), U.S. Army 75th Ranger Regiment, and the Light Reaction Regiment (Philippine Army) .

Disadvantages of the regimental system are hazardous regimental competition, a lack of interchangeability between units of different regiments, and more pronounced "old boy networks" within the military that may hamper efficiency and fairness.

A key aspect of the regimental system is that the regiment or battalion is the fundamental tactical building block. This flows historically from the colonial period, when battalions were widely dispersed and virtually autonomous, but is easily adapted to a number of different purposes. For example, a regiment might include different types of battalions (e.g. infantry or artillery) of different origins (e.g. regular or reserve).

Within the regimental system, soldiers, and usually officers, are always posted to a tactical unit of their own regiment whenever posted to field duty. In addition to combat units, other organizations are very much part of the regimental family: regimental training schools, serving members on "extra-regimental employment", regimental associations (retirees), bands and associated cadet groups. The aspects that an administrative regiment might have in common include a symbolic colonel-in-chief (often a member of the royal family), a colonel of the regiment or "honorary colonel" who protects the traditions and interests of the regimental family and insists on the maintenance of high standards, battle honours (honours earned by one unit of an administrative regiment are credited to the regiment), ceremonial uniforms, cap badges, peculiarities of insignia, stable belts, and regimental marches and songs. The regiment usually has a traditional "home station" or regimental depot, which is often a historic garrison that houses the regimental museum and regimental headquarters. The latter has a modest staff to support regimental committees and administer both the regular members and the association(s) of retired members.

=== Advantages and disadvantages ===
The regimental system is generally admired for the esprit de corps it engenders in its units' members, but efforts to implement it in countries with a previously existing continental system usually do not succeed. The system presents difficulties for military planners, who must deal with the problems of trying to keep soldiers of a regiment together throughout their careers and of administering separate garrisons, training and mess facilities. The regimental community of serving and retired members often makes it very difficult for planners to restructure forces by moving, merging or re-purposing units.

In those armies where the continental system exists, the regimental system is criticised as parochial and as creating unnecessary rivalry between different regiments. The question is also raised as to whether it is healthy to develop soldiers more loyal to their regiment than to the military in general. Regiments recruited from areas of political ferment (such as Scotland, Wales, Ireland, Quebec, India, etc.), tend to perform particularly well because of the loyalty their members exhibit to the regiments. Generally, the regimental system is found to function best in countries with small-to medium-sized military forces where the problems of administering vast numbers of personnel are not as prevalent. The regimental system works particularly well in an environment in which the prime role of the army consists of small-scale police actions and counterinsurgency operations, requiring prolonged deployment away from home. In such a situation, co-ordination between regiments is rarely necessary, and the esprit de corps of the regiment provides an emotional substitute for the sense of public approval that an army receives at home. This is particularly relevant to British experience during the days of the empire, where the army was virtually continuously engaged in low-intensity conflict with insurgents, and full-scale warfare was the exception rather than the rule.

A regimental system, since it is decentralized and the regiments are independent from each other, prevents the army from staging a coup d'état. This is best exemplified by the British Army: since the formation of the United Kingdom, there have been no military takeovers.

A regimental system can also foster close links between the regiment and the community from which it is recruited. This sense of community 'ownership' over local regiments can be seen in the public outcry over recent regimental amalgamations in the United Kingdom. On the other hand, recruitment from a single community can lead to a concentrated and potentially devastating local impact if the regiment takes heavy casualties.

Further, the regimental system offers the advantage of grouping like units together for centralized administrative, training, and logistical purposes, thereby creating an "economies of scale" effect and its ensuing increased efficiency.

An illustrative example of this is the modular integration employed by the United States Marine Corps, which can take elements from its regimentally grouped forces and specifically tailor combined arms task forces for a particular mission or the deployed Marine Expeditionary Units (MEU). This is achievable partially because of the Marines mission adaptability, flexibility, philosophy, shared culture, history and overall esprit de corps, which allows for near seamless interoperability.

== Commonwealth armies ==
In the British Army and armies modeled on it (such as the Australian, the New Zealand, the Canadian, the Pakistani, Bangladeshi, Myanmar and the Indian armies), the term regiment is used in two different ways: it can mean an administrative identity and grouping, or a tactical unit. In the former Dominion of Newfoundland, "Regiment" was used to describe the entirety of the fighting armed forces, the Royal Newfoundland Regiment.

In the Commonwealth countries listed above, the large administrative regiment has been the normal practice for many years. In the case of India, "large regiments" of four to five battalions date from 1923 and, since the 1950s, many of these have expanded even further. As an example, the Punjab Regiment of the Indian Army has expanded from four battalions in 1956 to its present strength of 20, while, in the Pakistan Army, several regiments have over 50 battalions.

In Australia, there is but one administrative infantry regiment in the regular army: the Royal Australian Regiment, consisting of all seven regular infantry battalions in the Army. The Australian Army Reserve also has state-based infantry regiments which administer the reserve infantry battalions.

In Pakistan, the word regiment is an administrative grouping. While individual battalions may have different roles (for example different battalions of the Frontier Force Regiment may be mechanized infantry, paratroop infantry, or mountain troops), the regiment is considered to encompass all of them.

=== British Army ===
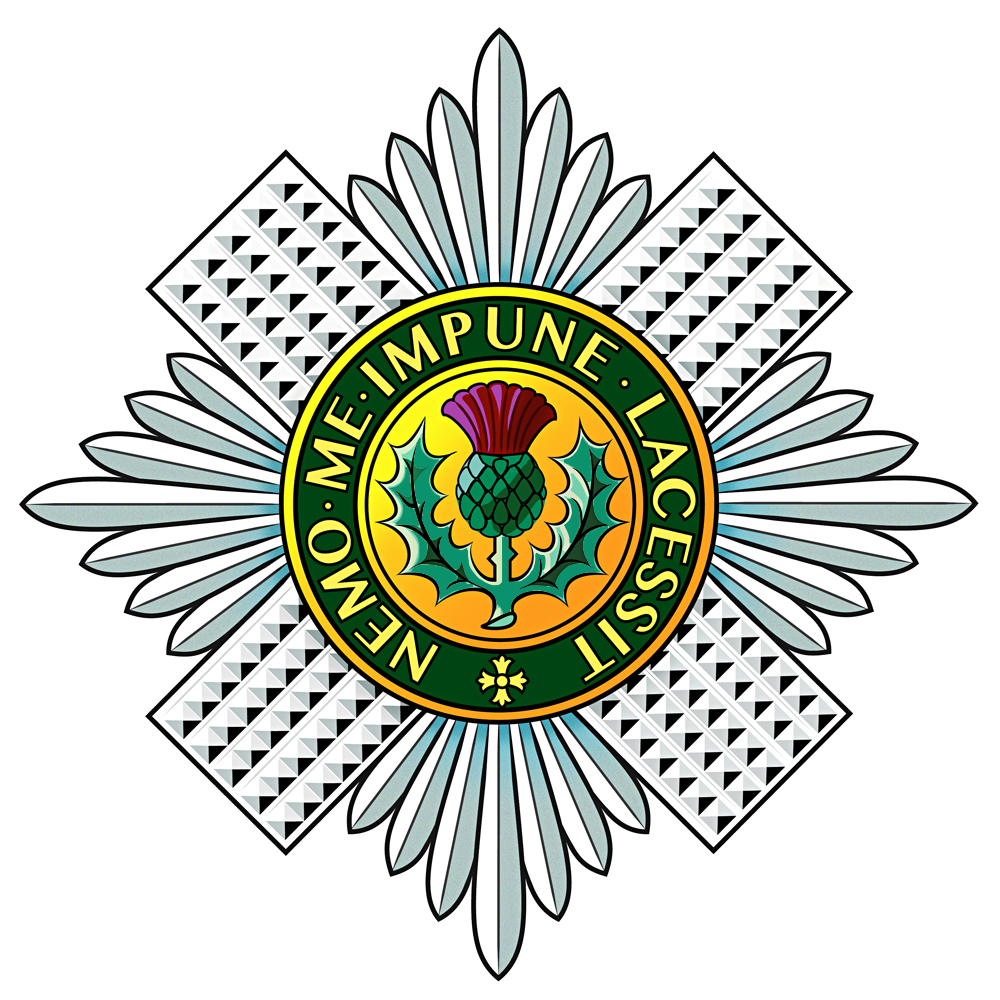
Regimental badge of the Scots Guards.

The modern British regimental system came about as a result of the 19th century Cardwell Reforms.

In the British Army, for most purposes, the regiment is the largest "permanent" organisational unit. Above regimental level, the organisation is changed to meet the tasks at hand. Because of their permanent nature, many regiments have long histories, often going back for centuries: the oldest British regiment still in existence is the Royal Jersey Militia, established in 1337 although historically the Jersey Militia are referred to as a regiment it is disputed that they are in fact a corps. The Buffs (Royal East Kent Regiment), formed in 1572, was the oldest infantry regiment. It now forms part of the Princess of Wales Royal Regiment.

In the United Kingdom, there existed until recently a number of administrative "divisions" in the infantry that encompassed several regiments, such as the Guards Division, the former Scottish Division (now a single regiment), or the Light Division (now also compressed into a multi-battalion single regiment). The reduction and consolidation of British infantry regiments that began in the late 1950s and concluded in 2006 has resulted in a system of administrative regiments each with several battalions, a band, a common badge and uniform etc.

In the British regimental system, the tactical regiment or battalion is the basic functional unit and its commanding officer more autonomous than in continental systems. Divisional and brigade commanders generally do not immerse themselves in the day-to-day functioning of a battalion – they can replace the commanding officer but will not micro-manage the unit. The regimental sergeant major is another key figure, responsible to the CO for unit discipline and the behaviour of the NCOs.

It should, however, be noted that amalgamations beginning in the late 1950s and ending in 2006 have diluted the British regimental system through the now almost universal adoption of "large regiments" for the infantry of the Army. As of 2014, only thirteen line infantry regiments survive, each comprising up to six of the former battalions that previously had separate regimental status. Only the five Guards regiments retain their historic separate identities. Similarly, as of 2015, only eight of the regiments of the Royal Armoured Corps (cavalry plus Royal Tank Regiments) survive.

One administrative armoured regiment of the British Army consisted of more than one tactical regiment. The Royal Tank Regiment until 2014 had two (1 and 2 RTR), and once had many more. They were all amalgamated into a single regiment. Artillery units are considered part of a single administrative regiment, but there are typically several tactical artillery regiments.

The British Army also has battalion-sized tactical regiments of the Royal Engineers, Royal Corps of Signals, Army Air Corps, Royal Logistic Corps, and Royal Military Police.

==== Infantry ====
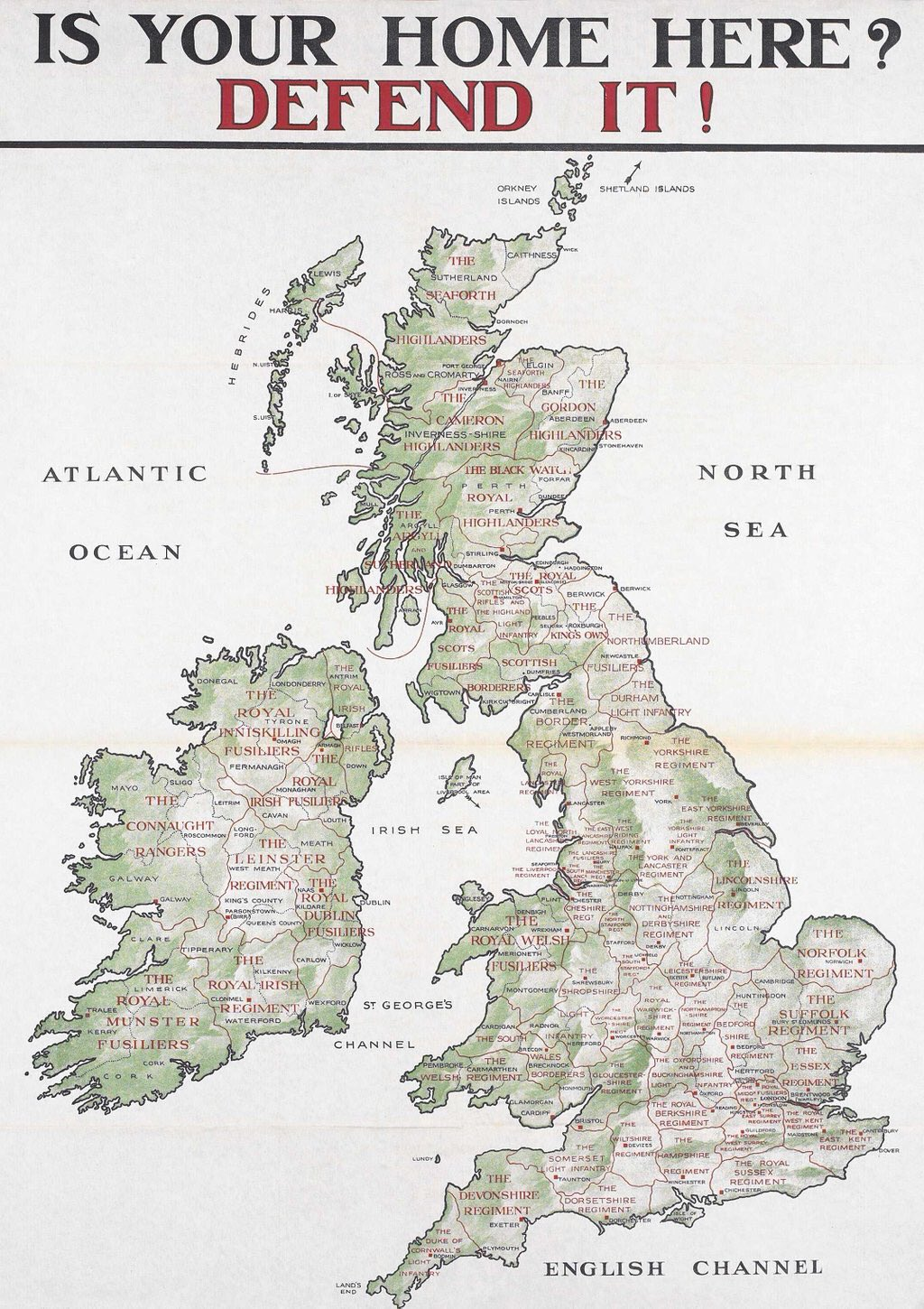
"Is your home here? Defend it!" Propaganda poster from 1915 with a map of the regimental recruiting districts of the infantry of the British Army.

Administrative infantry regiments are composed of one or more battalions. When a regiment has only one battalion, the battalion may have exactly the same name as the regiment. In Britain, every infantry battalion bears a number, even if it is the only remaining battalion in the regiment. Until after the Second World War, every regiment had at least two battalions. Traditionally, the regular battalions were the 1st and 2nd Battalions, the militia (later Special Reserve) battalion was the 3rd Battalion, and the Army Reserve battalions were the 4th Battalion, the 5th Battalion and up. A few regiments had up to four regular battalions and more than one militia battalion, which disrupted the numbering, but this was rare. For this reason, although the regular battalion today (if there is only one) will always be the 1st Battalion, the TA battalions may have non-consecutive numbers.

In practice, it is impossible to exercise all the administrative functions of a true regiment when the regiment consists of a single unit. Soldiers, and particularly officers, cannot spend a full career in one battalion. Thus in the Armoured Corps, the traditional administrative "regiment" tends to play more of a ceremonial role, while in practice, its members are administered by their corps or "branch" as in the Artillery. Thus soldiers and officers can serve in many different "regiments", changing hat badges without too much concern during their career. Indeed, in the artillery, all regiments wear the same badge.

=== Canadian Army ===
In Canada, the regiment is a formation of one or more units; existing almost exclusively for reasons of heritage, the continuance of battle honours and esprit de corps. The three regular force infantry regiments each consist of three regular force battalions of approximately 600 soldiers, in addition to one or more reserve battalions. Canadian battalions are employed tactically and administratively within brigade groups.

Armoured regiments in Canada since the end of the Second World War have usually consisted of a single tactical regiment. During the 1960s, three Canadian regiments had both regular and militia components, which were disbanded shortly after unification in 1968. Currently, one regiment is organised with two tactical regiments, 12^{e} Régiment blindé du Canada and 12^{e} Régiment blindé du Canada (Milice) are both part of the administrative regiment 12^{e} Régiment blindé du Canada.

Artillery units are considered part of a single administrative regiment, but there are typically several tactical artillery regiments. They are designated by numbers, names or both. For example, the tactical regiments 1st Regiment, Royal Canadian Horse Artillery, 7th Toronto Regiment, RCA and many others are part of the single administrative regiment The Royal Regiment of Canadian Artillery. In Britain, the Royal Regiment of Artillery works in the same way.

Administrative infantry regiments are composed of one or more battalions. When a regiment has only one battalion, the battalion may have exactly the same name as the regiment. For example, The North Saskatchewan Regiment is the only battalion in the administrative regiment of the same name. When there is more than one battalion, they are distinguished by numbers, subsidiary titles or both.

=== Indian Army ===
Upon its inception, the Indian Army inherited the British Army's organisational structure, which is still maintained today. Therefore, like its predecessor, an Indian infantry regiment's responsibility is not to undertake field operations but to provide battalions and well-trained personnel to the field formations. As such, it is common to find battalions of the same regiment spread across several brigades, divisions, corps, commands, and even theatres. Like its British and Commonwealth counterparts, troops enlisted within the regiment are immensely loyal, take great pride in the regiment to which they are assigned, and generally spend their entire career within the regiment.

Most Indian Army infantry regiments recruit based on certain selection criteria, such as region (for example, the Assam Regiment), caste/community (Jat Regiment), or religion (Sikh Regiment). Most regiments continue the heritage of regiments raised under the British Raj, but some have been raised after independence, some of which have specialised in border defence, in particular the Ladakh Scouts, the Arunachal Scouts, and the Sikkim Scouts.

Over the years there have been fears that troops' allegiance lay more with their regiments and the regions/castes/communities/religions from which they were recruited, as opposed to the Indian union as a whole. Thus some "all India" or "all class" regiments have been created, which recruit troops from all over India, regardless of region, caste, community, or religion: such as the Brigade of the Guards (which later converted to the mechanised infantry profile) and the Parachute Regiment.

The Indian Army has many regiments, majority of them infantry, with single-battalion cavalry and artillery regiments. These are a legacy of the British Indian army during the years when the British ruled India before 15 August 1947. Each infantry regiment may have one or more battalions, while cavalry, armour and artillery regiments are single-battalion formations. There are regimental headquarters (called as a centre) for each regiment.

Each regiment of infantry is commanded by a colonel and assisted by a lieutenant colonel.

== Irish Army ==
The Irish Army field artillery units are called regiments. They are divided into batteries and together the regiments form the Artillery Corps. Air Defence units are organised as a single regiment with individual batteries stationed around the country.

== Philippine Army ==
The Philippine Army currently has 3 regiments dedicated to special operations under the AFP Special Operations Command. They specialized in direct action, jungle warfare, urban warfare, special reconnaissance, unconventional warfare, psychological warfare, counter-terrorism, mass base and sniping operations against hostile positions depending on the situation of a certain place.

=== Scout Rangers ===
The Scout Rangers, known officially as the First Scout Ranger Regiment, specializes in anti-guerrilla jungle warfare, raids, ambushes, close quarters combat, urban warfare and sabotage. It was formed on November 25, 1950, under the command of former AFP Vice Chief of Staff and Defense Secretary Rafael M. Ileto. It was modelled after two legendary fighting groups, the intelligence gathering American Alamo Scouts and the combat ready US Army Rangers. It was also formed to combat insurgencies such as the Communist and Moro Rebellions. It currently have more than 2500 Members.

=== Special Forces ===
The Special Forces Regiment (Airborne) is a special forces unit of the Philippine Army. It is based on and continually trains with its American counterpart, the U.S. Army Special Forces (Green Berets). It was established in 1962 by then Captain Fidel V. Ramos PA (INF) (first commanding officer of the SFR-A), primarily trained in both unconventional warfare operations and psychological warfare operations.

Like the Scout Rangers, members of the Special Forces Regiment of the Philippine Army are also highly trained in counter-insurgency operations. Upon assignment to the Special Forces, soldiers are made to undergo the Basic Airborne Course. They, later-on, undergo the Special Forces Operations Course - an eight-month course that equips each SF soldier in the basics of Special Forces and unconventional warfare operations. Each member of the SF Regiment may opt to undergo specialty courses as well after finishing the Special Forces basic course. These include, but is not limited to, training in demolitions and bomb disposal (EOD), psychological warfare operations (PSYOPS), riverine operations including combat diving, intelligence operations, weapons, medics, as well as VIP security training in preparation for reassignment with the Presidential Security Group.

The basic combat organization of the Special Forces is the 12-man Special Forces Team. An SF Team will have at least one of each SF MOS present in the team.

=== Light Reaction Regiment ===
The Light Reaction Regiment is the premier counter-terrorist unit of the Philippine Army. It was formerly known as the Light Reaction Battalion and Light Reaction Company. Due to its specialization in counter-terrorism operations and its formation with the assistance of American advisers, the Light Reaction Regiment has been sometimes referred to as the Philippines' Delta Force. It traces its origins back to the year 2000 when non-commissioned officers from the Scout Rangers and 1st Special Forces Regiment (Airborne) were trained by American military advisers from the 1st Battalion, 1st Special Forces Group.

== Russian/Soviet Armed Forces ==
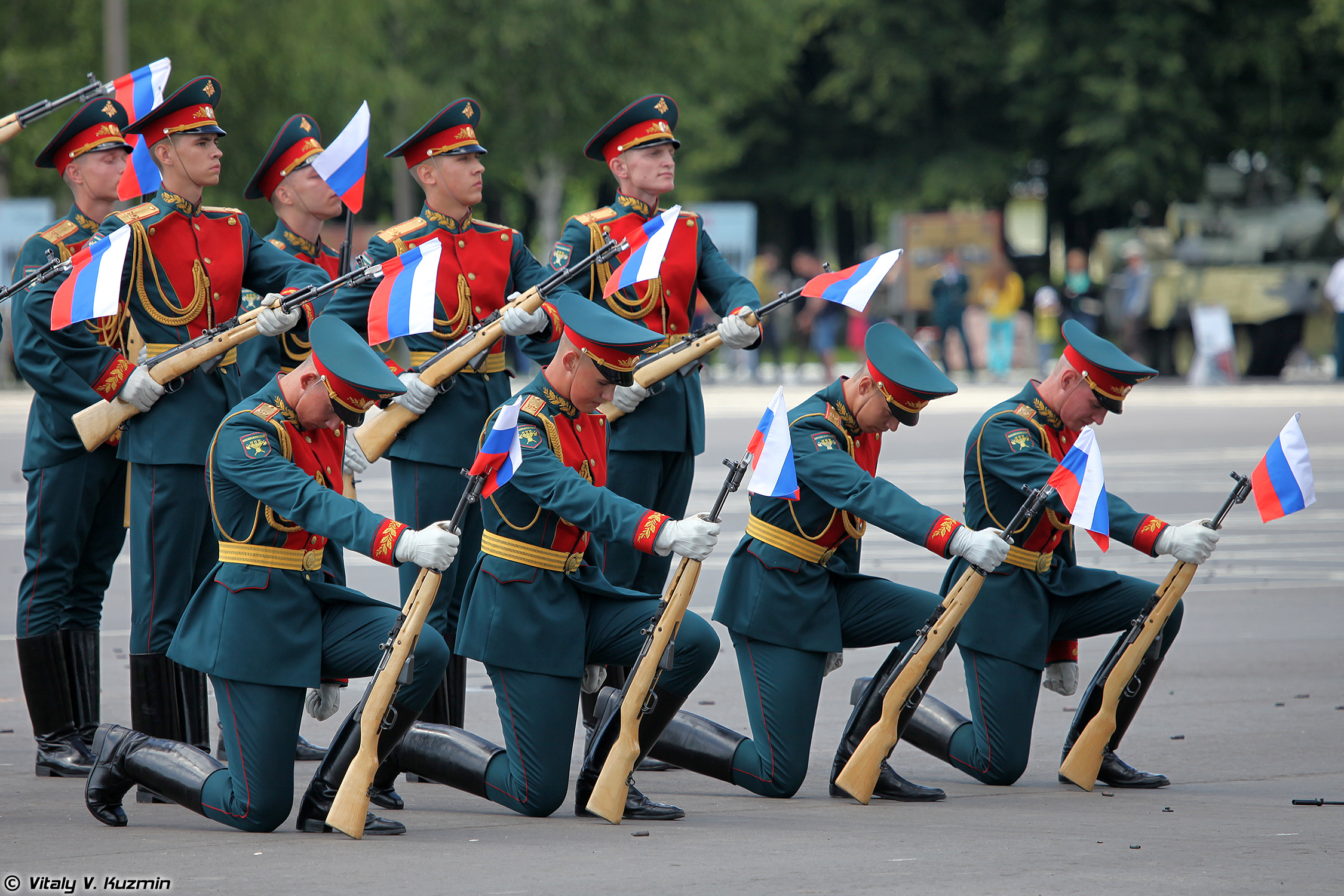
Personnel of the 154th Preobrazhensky Independent Commandant's Regiment during an exhibition drill.

The regiments (Russian: полк) of the Russian Army and armed forces influenced by Russia consist of battalions (Russian: батальон), in the infantry or tank troops, divizions (Russian: дивизион) in the artillery troops, and squadrons (Russian: эскадрилья) in aviation troops. Land forces regiments are subdivided into companies (Russian: рота) (or batteries in the artillery) and platoons (Russian: взвод). These also include many support units of either company or platoon size.

On the march, a regiment normally travels in column along one or two routes, averaging 20–30 km/h when moving on roads or 15 km/h going cross-country. The main force is preceded by reconnaissance and advanced guards and protected on the flanks and the rear by security elements. When offensive operations begin, a regiment normally assumes attack formation about 1,000 metres from the enemy's position and attacks along a front typically 4 to 5 kilometres wide, but can vary between 3 and 8 kilometres. During the attack the average speed of advance is 200 metres per minute with BTRs or BMPs normally following 100 to 400 metres behind tanks and 50 to 100 metres of spacing between vehicles.

=== Motor rifle regiment ===
The motor rifle regiment was one of the basic tactical units within the Soviet Ground Forces, totaling around 2,500 officers and other ranks. While normally operating as part of a motor rifle division or tank division, it was capable of short-term independent operations. By the late 1980s, it consisted of a regimental headquarters in command of three motor rifle battalions, each numbering around five hundred personnel and equipped with either BMP infantry fighting vehicles or BTR armoured personnel carriers, and one tank battalion, typically consisting of thirty-one T-64, T-72 or T-80 tanks, although older models were present in units outside the European theater. These were supported by a battalion of eighteen 122mm artillery pieces, either the self-propelled 2S1 Gvozdika in BMP regiments or towed D-30 howitzers in BTR regiments, though some BTR regiments also used the 2S1, with additional fire support from the organic mortar battery in each infantry battalion. Additional combat support came in the form of an air defence missile and artillery company with four SA-9 or SA-13s and four ZSU-23-4 or 2S6 Tunguskas, an antitank missile battery with nine BRDM-mounted AT-3 Sagger or AT-5 Spandrel launchers, a reconnaissance company mounted on BMPs, BRDMs and motorbikes and an engineer company. Other non-combat formations included a signals company, chemical protection platoon, material support company, maintenance company, and regimental medical point.

=== Tank regiment ===
The tank regiment was found in both motorised rifle divisions and tank divisions, with slight organisational differences depending between the two. By the late 1980s, tank regiments operating as part of motorised rifle divisions contained slightly over 1,100 officers and other ranks while those operating within tank divisions contained over 1,600. A regimental headquarters oversaw command of three tank battalions of thirty-one tanks each, typically T-64, T-72, or T-80 tanks although some units used older models, and an artillery battalion of eighteen 2S1 Gvozdika self-propelled howitzers, with some using the older towed D-30 howitzer. Tank regiments operating as part of a tank division included a fifth combat battalion of motorised infantry, identical to those in BMP-equipped motorised rifle regiments. Combat support and combat service support subunits were the same as in motorised rifle regiments with the exception of the antitank missile battery.

=== Divisional Artillery regiment (mechanized/armored division) ===
The artillery regiment was used to provide fire support, but its size and personnel staffing differed depending on whether it was part of a motorised rifle division or tank division. The artillery regiment of an MRD consisted of three battalions of eighteen 2S3 Akatsiyas each and a battalion of eighteen BM-21 Grads, numbering just under 1,300 personnel total, while a TD artillery regiment had one less battalion of 2S3s and a little over one thousand personnel total. This was the standard model by the late 1980s; however, not all artillery regiments had yet to conformed to it, and one or more of the battalions might have used older weapon systems like the D-30 towed howitzer. Each regiment was led by a command control battery and included an artillery reconnaissance battery, motor transport company, maintenance company, regimental medical point, chemical protection platoon and supply and service platoon.

=== Anti-aircraft rocket regiment ===
An anti-aircraft rocket regiment was an important part of a motor rifle division or tank division's effort to envelop the battlefield in an extensive air defence network. Numbering a little over five hundred personnel total, the SAM regiment consisted of a regimental headquarters in charge of twenty SA-6 Gainfuls organised into five missile firing batteries; most were SA-6a platforms although since 1979 a limited number of SA-6bs were also deployed and some regiments used the SA-8 Gecko as an alternative. Each missile battery, along with the regimental headquarter and missile technical battery, were also equipped with three MANPADs, either the SA-7 Grail, SA-14 Gremlin or SA-16 Gimlet. Besides the missile technical battery, other support subunits included an artillery reconnaissance battery, motor transport company, maintenance company and chemical protection platoon.

=== Antiaircraft artillery regiment ===
Antiaircraft artillery (AAA) regiments in the late 1980s took the place of SAM regiments in divisions which were assigned to rear areas. These were equipped with twenty-four S-60 57mm Anti Aircraft Guns organised into four firing batteries. Each firing battery along with the regimental headquarters were also equipped with three MANPADs, either the SA-7 Grail, SA-14 Gremlin or SA-16 Gimlet. Additional subunits include a command and control battery and service battery.

== United States ==
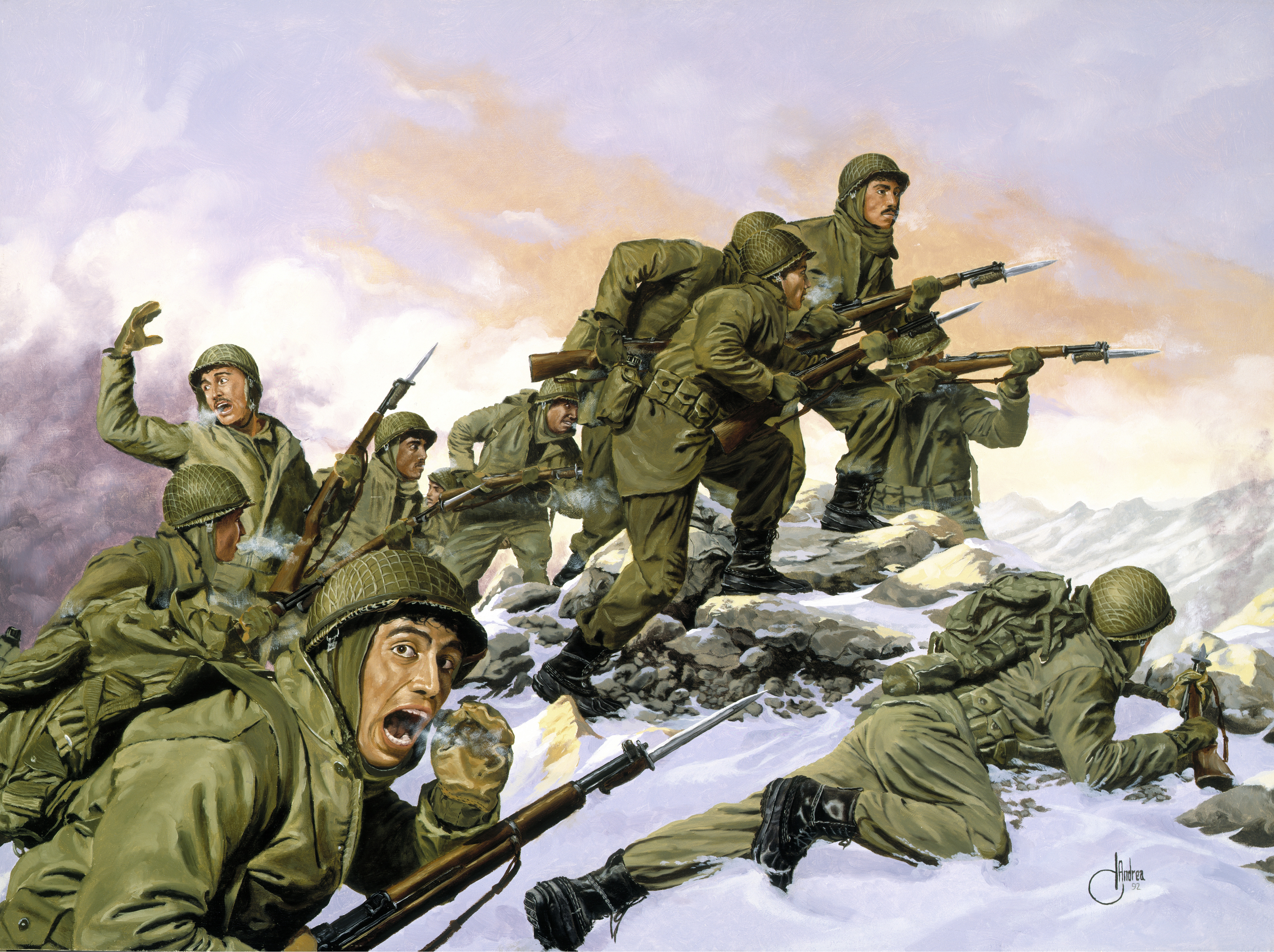
The Puerto Rican 65th Infantry Regiment's bayonet charge against a Chinese division during the Korean War.

Historically, the United States Army was organized into regiments, except from 1792 to 1796 during the existence of the Legion of the United States. During this period the Army, or "Legion", was organized into four "sub-legions", 18th century forerunners of the modern combined arms brigade that combined infantry, riflemen, artillery, and cavalry. When combined with other regiments during wartime, for active field operations, regiments were further formed into brigades and divisions.

From colonial times, the regiment consisted of a small regimental headquarters (regimental headquarters companies not existing before 1915) and in 1775 ten "line" companies, based on the British Army model, without any permanent intermediate level of organization, viz., battalion headquarters organic to the regiment. From 1776 through 1783 American infantry regiments contained from as few as seven companies (e.g. South Carolina Rifles) to as many as twelve (Pennsylvania Rifles and Maryland State troops) with Continental Army infantry regiments having eight companies (increased to nine in 1781). (Briefly, from 1790 to 1792, regiments were organized into three battalions of four companies each.) Traditionally, the regiment and battalion were one and the same, with the "battalion" simply being the regiment organized for battle.

During the Civil War, there were nine new United States regular army infantry regiments (11th though the 19th) added to the ten already existing. The old regiments (1st through 10th) were single-battalion, ten-company regiments, but the new regiments were authorized three battalions of eight companies each. However, only three of these nine regiments ever reached full strength of three battalions, with four others only achieving a manning level of two full battalions. Regiments were usually commanded by a colonel, assisted by a lieutenant colonel and a major, as well as additional staff officers and enlisted men in the regimental headquarters. Occasionally, a regimental commander would organize several companies into one, or rarely two, temporary organizations, called battalions, under command of the regiment's lieutenant colonel, major, or a senior captain. (A historic example of this arrangement is the 7th Cavalry Regiment during the Battle of the Little Big Horn in 1876.)

Many more additional regiments of the United States Volunteers were recruited from each state during the American Civil War according to General Orders No. 15., War Department, Adjutant General's Office, Washington, May 4, 1861:

The President of the United States having called for a Volunteer Force to aid in the enforcement of the laws and the suppression of insurrection, and to consist of thirty-nine regiments of infantry and one regiment of cavalry, making a minimum aggregate of (34,506) thirty-four thousand five hundred and six officers and enlisted men, and a maximum aggregate of (42,034) forty two thousand and thirty-four officers and enlisted men, the following plan of organization has been adopted, and is directed to be printed for general information.

In 1890, the number of companies in a regiment was reduced from the traditional ten to only eight, as the end of the Indian Wars became evident and troop reductions became in order. However, in 1898 as the war with Spain began, a three-battalion, 12-company structure was effected. This expanded regimental structure produced units, proportionally roughly the same approximate size as the single battalion, ten-company regiments of the Civil War. (For example: 101 officers and enlisted men per company, and a 36-member regimental headquarters, with 1,046 per typical Union Army infantry regiment in 1861, vs. 112 officers and enlisted men per company, and the same 36-member regimental headquarters, with 1,380 per regiment in a typical U.S. Army infantry regiment in 1898.) After the short war the Army reduced the size of companies, battalions, and regiments by about 30% under demobilization. However, the number of companies and battalions per regiment remained at 12 and three, respectively.

Until 1917, under its traditional triangular organizational plan, infantry regiments were organized into brigades of three regiments, with three infantry brigades (for a total of nine infantry regiments), along with one brigade each of cavalry and field artillery constituting a division. In 1917 the Army adopted the square division organizational plan, which massively increased the size of units from the company through corps, more than tripling, or nearly quadrupling, the number of troops per unit. (From 1915 to 1917, the authorized strength of rifle companies increased from 76 officers and enlisted men to 256, and infantry regiments grew from 959 to 3,720.)

The "square division" consisted of two infantry brigades of two infantry regiments each, with each regiment containing a regimental headquarters company, a machinegun company, a supply company, and 12 rifle companies organized into three battalions of four rifle companies each. (The single machine gun company reported directly to regimental headquarters.) The division also contained an artillery brigade of three regiments and three separate combat service support regiments: engineer, quartermaster, and medical.

The Army reorganized in preparation for the Second World War by effecting its triangular division organizational structure in 1939. Under this plan, divisional brigades were eliminated and the division consisted of three infantry regiments and one artillery regiment, styled as "Division Artillery", but usually consisting of battalions of the same regiment. The infantry regiments still contained three battalions; there were now "headquarters and headquarters" companies (HHCs) not only at the regimental-level but in each battalion as well. The battalions still contained four "line" companies, but instead of four rifle companies, now had three rifle companies and a heavy weapons company (containing machine guns and mortars). The regiment's machine gun company became an anti-tank company, the supply company became the service company, and a cannon company and a medical detachment were added to the regiment. In 1942 the Army began organizing armored divisions into combat commands, which grouped armor, armored infantry, and armored field artillery battalions into three tactical groups within the division without regard to regimental affiliation. However, armored regiment designations were retained for lineage and heraldic purposes.

As the United States Army transformed after the Korean War for potential combat against a nuclear-armed Warsaw Pact, changes began in 1956 to transform infantry regiments into battle groups under its new Pentomic organization. Under this plan, battalions were eliminated and the infantry battle groups consisted of an Headquarters and Headquarters Company, five rifle companies, and a combat support company. This scheme retained the regimental designation for lineage and heraldry purposes, but the regiment ceased to exist as an intact organization for both infantry and field artillery units. The Divisional Artillery were now composed of several unrelated artillery battalions.

By 1965, the Army had eliminated the regiment (replaced by the brigade) under the Reorganization Objective Army Divisions (ROAD) plan as a tactical and administrative organization in all combat arms, save for a few armored cavalry regiments. However the battalion was restored as a tactical echelon, now organized into an HHC, three rifle companies, and a combat support company. The ROAD structure sealed the fate of the regiment in the U.S. Army, confirming its elimination as a level of command that had begun in 1942 with the "combat command" organization of the armored divisions and furthered by the Pentomic experiment in the 1950s. By 2015, the only Army unit still organized as a traditional regiment was the 75th Ranger Regiment.

In the 20th century, by using modern industrial management techniques, the Army was able to draft, assemble, equip, train and then employ huge masses of conscripted civilians in very short order, starting with minimal resources. Beginning with the First World War, as units became increasingly larger, and weapon systems and equipment became more complex, the regiment, while still filling a role as the immediate headquarters for its organic battalions, began to be replaced by the brigade as the intermediate tactical and operational headquarters for battalions, with the division becoming the senior administrative and logistical headquarters for the battalions, regiments, and brigades under its command.

A new system, the Combat Arms Regimental System, or CARS, was adopted in 1957 to replace the old regimental system. CARS uses the Army's traditional regiments as parent organizations for historical purposes, but the primary building blocks are divisions, brigades, and battalions. Each battalion carries an association with a parent regiment, even though the regimental organization no longer exists. In some brigades several numbered battalions carrying the same regimental association may still serve together, and tend to consider themselves part of the traditional regiment when in fact they are independent battalions serving a brigade, rather than a regimental, headquarters.

The United States Army Regimental System (USARS) was established in 1981 to replace the Combat Arms Regimental System, to provide each soldier with continuous identification with a single regiment, and to support that concept with a personnel system that would increase a soldier's probability of serving recurring assignments with his or her regiment. The USARS was developed with the intention that it would enhance combat effectiveness by providing the opportunity for a regimental affiliation, thus obtaining some of the benefits of the traditional regimental system.

Exceptions exist to USARS regimental titles, including the armored cavalry regiments (now defunct) and the 75th Ranger Regiment created in 1986. On 1 October 2005, the word "regiment" was formally appended to the name of all active and inactive CARS and USARS regiments. So, for example, the 1st Cavalry officially became titled the 1st Cavalry Regiment.

=== United States Marine Corps ===
The historical background of the use of regiments in the United States Marine Corps (USMC) is contained within USMC: A Complete History and a summary of that information follows:

From the American Revolution until 1913 it was common practice for USMC detachments (both ship-based, and shore-based) to be combined to form provisional units. Most often these formations took the form of provisional battalions, but on occasion became provisional regiments, provisional brigades, or rarely (especially when combined with Navy personnel) naval infantry brigades. These organizations were intentionally temporary as the USMC did not usually maintain standing forces larger than company size, but rather created "task units" on an "as needed" basis.

While provisional regiments, designated variously as the 1st through 4th Regiments, had been formed for expeditionary operations in Panama (1895) and Philippines (1899), the lineage of modern USMC regiments began in 1913 with the creation of the 1st and 2nd Advanced Base Force Regiments. These two regiments, (currently the 2nd and 1st Marines, respectively), along with the numerical forebears of the 3rd and 4th Marines, (formed in 1914 for the short-lived Tampico Affair with Mexico, involving the occupation of Veracruz), are the pre-World War I antecedents to the several regiments of the modern USMC.

Beginning in World War I, with the USMC's participation with the U.S. Army in the American Expeditionary Force, in which the 5th and 6th Marines (along with the 6th Machine Gun Battalion) formed the 4th Marine Brigade of the U.S. Army 2nd Division, the USMC began organizing larger standing forces. World War I–era USMC units mirrored equivalent U.S. Army units by employing the "square division" organizational plan in forming its regiments and brigades.

During the Second World War, the USMC organized its regiments and divisions under the "triangular division" model developed by the Army in 1939. Modern USMC regiments and divisions continue to be organized using a triangular model very similar to the WWII version, with slight variations to adapt to modern weapons, equipment, and enlisted rank structure.

Current Marine infantry, field artillery, and combat logistics battalions are organized into regiments, commanded by a colonel. Marine infantry and field artillery regiments are sequentially numbered and are referred to generically as "nth Marines" or "nth Marine Regiment", as in 1st Marines (an infantry regiment) or 12th Marine Regiment (a field artillery regiment). Marine infantry regiments consist of a regimental headquarters and service company (H&S Co) and three identical infantry battalions. Marine field artillery regiments consist of a regimental headquarters and service battery (H&S Bttry), a target acquisition battery, and from two to four field artillery battalions.

Marine logistics groups (MLG) contain two types of regiments; one headquarters (HQ) regiment (except in the Reserve 4th MLG) and two combat logistics regiments (CLR). Each of these two types of regiments contain a headquarters company and varying numbers and types of logistics battalions and separate logistics companies, depending upon whether the regiment's primary mission is to provide direct support to (1) a regimental combat team (RCT) or a Marine amphibious unit (MEU), or (2) provide general support across the Marine expeditionary force (MEF), including intermediate ground logistics support to Marine aviation units. These varying types of battalions and separate companies include: combat logistics, maintenance, and supply battalions, and combat logistics, communications, food service, and service companies (the latter three types in 3rd MLG only).

The HQ regiments (whose primary mission includes providing support to the MEUs) are not numbered; however, the CLRs are numbered according to their primary mission. CLRs that support RCTs have the same number as the parent Marine division of its supported RCT. Therefore, CLR 2 supports the RCTs of the 2nd Marine Division. CLRs that provide general maintenance and supply support to the MEF are designated by a two-digit number: the first digit is the Hindu-Arabic numeral equivalent of the MEF's roman numeral designation, and the second digit is always an arbitrarily assigned numeral "5". Therefore, the CLR that provides general maintenance and supply support to III MEF is CLR 35.

The USMC deploys battalions from its infantry regiments to form the nucleus of a battalion landing team (BLT) as the ground combat element (GCE) of a Marine expeditionary unit (MEU). However, a USMC infantry regiment may deploy en masse to form the nucleus of an RCT or regimental landing team (RLT) as the GCE of a Marine expeditionary brigade (MEB). In both cases the infantry component is reinforced with ground combat support forces including field artillery, reconnaissance, assault amphibian vehicle, light armored reconnaissance vehicle, tank, and combat engineer units. The resulting GCE is then combined with an aviation combat element (ACE), a logistics combat element (LCE), and a command element (CE) to form a Marine air–ground task force (MAGTF).

== See also ==
- Demi-brigade
- Military organization
- Regimental combat team
- Regimental depot
- Regimental police
