= British war crimes =

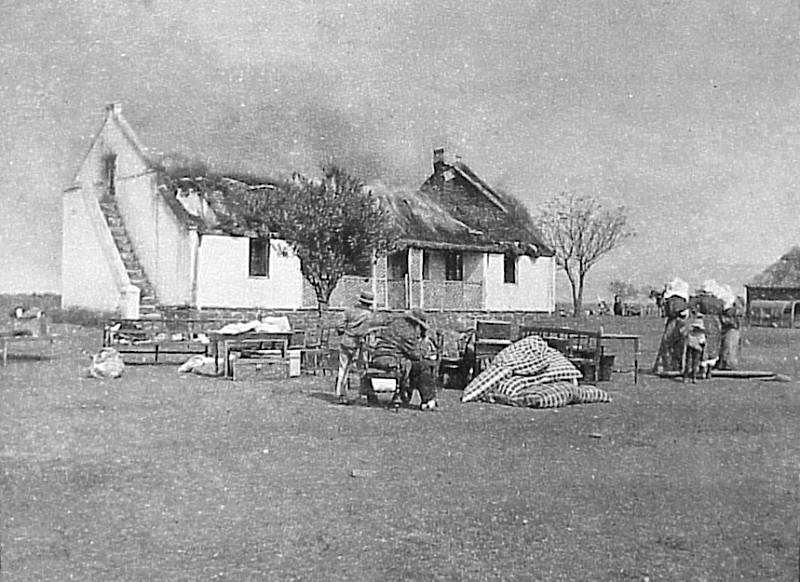
Boer civilians watching British soldiers burn down their homestead, Second Boer War.

British war crimes are acts committed by the armed forces of the United Kingdom that have violated the laws and customs of war since the Hague Conventions of 1899 and 1907, from the Boer War to the War in Afghanistan (2001–2021). Such acts have included the summary executions of prisoners of war and unarmed shipwreck survivors, the use of excessive force during the interrogation of POWs and enemy combatants, and the use of violence against civilian non-combatants and their property.‌

== Definition ==
War crimes are defined as acts which violate the laws and customs of war (established by the Hague Conventions of 1899 and 1907), or acts that are grave breaches of the Geneva Conventions and Additional Protocol I and Additional Protocol II. The Fourth Geneva Convention of 1949 extends the protection of civilians and prisoners of war during military occupation, even in the case where there is no armed resistance, for the period of one year after the end of hostilities, although the occupying power should be bound to several provisions of the convention as long as "such Power exercises the functions of government in such territory."

The Manual of the Law of Armed Conflict published by the UK Ministry of Defence uses the 1945 definition from the Nuremberg Charter, which defines a war crime as "Violations of the laws or customs of war. Such violations shall include, but not be limited to, murder, ill-treatment or deportation to slave labour or for any other purpose of civilian population of or in occupied territory, murder or ill-treatment of prisoners of war or persons on the seas, killing of hostages, plunder of public or private property, wanton destruction of cities, towns or villages, or devastation not justified by military necessity." The manual also notes that "violations of the 1949 Geneva Conventions not amounting to 'grave breaches' are also war crimes."

The 2004 Laws of Armed Combat Manual says

Serious violations of the law of armed conflict, other than those listed as grave breaches in the [1949 Geneva] Conventions or [the 1977 Additional Protocol I], remain war crimes and punishable as such. A distinction must be drawn between crimes established by treaty or convention and crimes under customary international law. Treaty crimes only bind parties to the treaty in question, whereas customary international law is binding on all states. Many treaty crimes are merely codifications of customary law and to that extent binding on all states, even those that are not parties.

The 2004 publication also notes that "A person is normally only guilty of a war crime if he commits it with intent and knowledge."

== South Africa ==
=== Counterinsurgency ===
As part of the strategy to defeat the guerrilla warfare of the Boer Commandos, farms were destroyed to prevent the Boers from resupplying from a home base. This included the systematic destruction of crops and slaughtering of livestock.

=== Destruction of towns ===
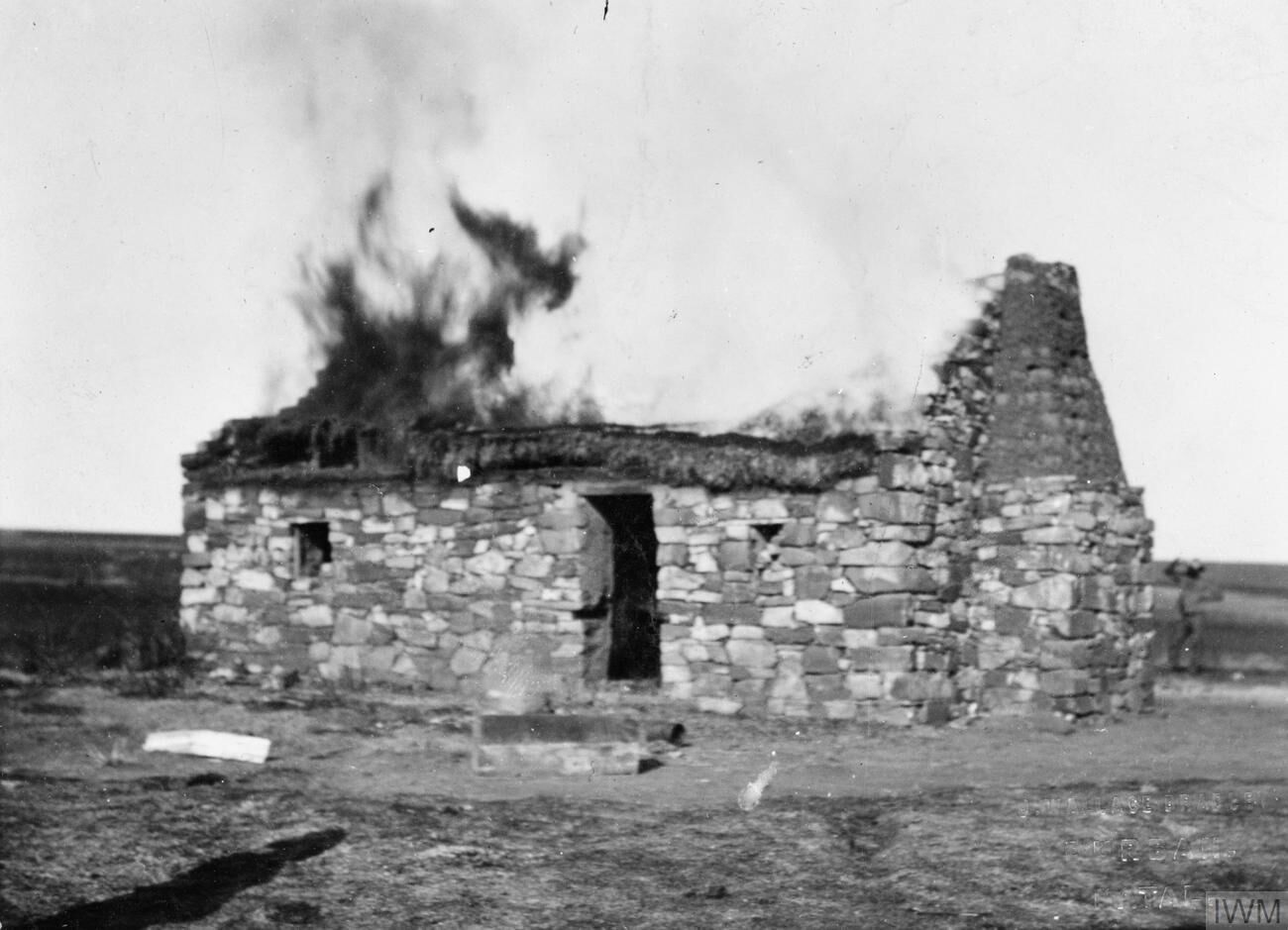
A Boer farmhouse set on fire by British troops

==== Ventersburg ====
On 26 October 1900, the British justice of the peace at Ventersburg (in the former Orange Free State), William Williams, relayed a secret message to Field Marshal Lord Frederick Roberts alleging that Boer Commandos were concentrating in the village. Roberts decreed that "an example should be made of Ventersburg". On 28 October, Roberts issued orders to General Bruce Hamilton that all houses belonging to absent males were to be burned down. After burning down the village and its Dutch Reformed church, Hamilton posted a bulletin stating: "The town of Ventersburg has been cleansed of supplies and partly burnt, and all the farms in the vicinity destroyed, on account of the frequent attacks on the railway lines in the neighborhood. The Boer women and children who are left behind should apply to the Boer Commandants for food, who will supply them unless they wish to see them starve. No supplies will be sent from the railway to the town."

On 1 November 1900, Major Edward Pine-Coffin wrote in his diary that the remaining civilian population of Ventersburg had been transported to concentration camps. He admitted to having families divided, with male and female Afrikaners sent to different locations "so that after the war they will have some difficulty in getting together." The destruction of Ventersburg was denounced in the House of Commons by Liberal MP David Lloyd George, who said Hamilton "is a brute and a disgrace to the uniform he wears."

==== Louis Trichardt ====
On 9 May 1901, Cols. Johan William Colenbrander and H. L. Grenfell rode into Louis Trichardt ahead of a mixed force of about 600 men. In addition to Kitchener's Fighting Scouts, the force included elements of the Pietersburg Light Horse, the Wiltshire Regiment, the Bushveldt Carbineers (BVC), a large force of Black South African "Irregulars", and six members of the War Office's Intelligence Department commanded by Captain Alfred James Taylor.

Even though Louis Trichardt was "reeling from the annual effects of malaria", British and Commonwealth servicemen sacked the town and arrested an estimated 90 male residents suspected of links to the Zoutpansberg Commando.

On 11 May 1901, the remaining residents of Louis Trichardt, including both the Afrikaner and "Cape Coloured" populations, were ordered to evacuate the town. According to local resident E. R. Smith, British and Commonwealth servicemen helped themselves to whatever "curios" they wanted and allowed the civilian population only a short time to gather their things. The town of Louis Trichardt was then burned down by Native South African "Irregulars" under the supervision of Captain Taylor. The civilian population was force marched between 11 and 18 May to the British concentration camp at Pietersburg.

According to South African historian Charles Leach, Captain Taylor "emphatically told" the local Venda and Sotho communities "to help themselves to the land and whatever else they wanted as the Boers would not be returning after the war."

=== Concentration camps ===
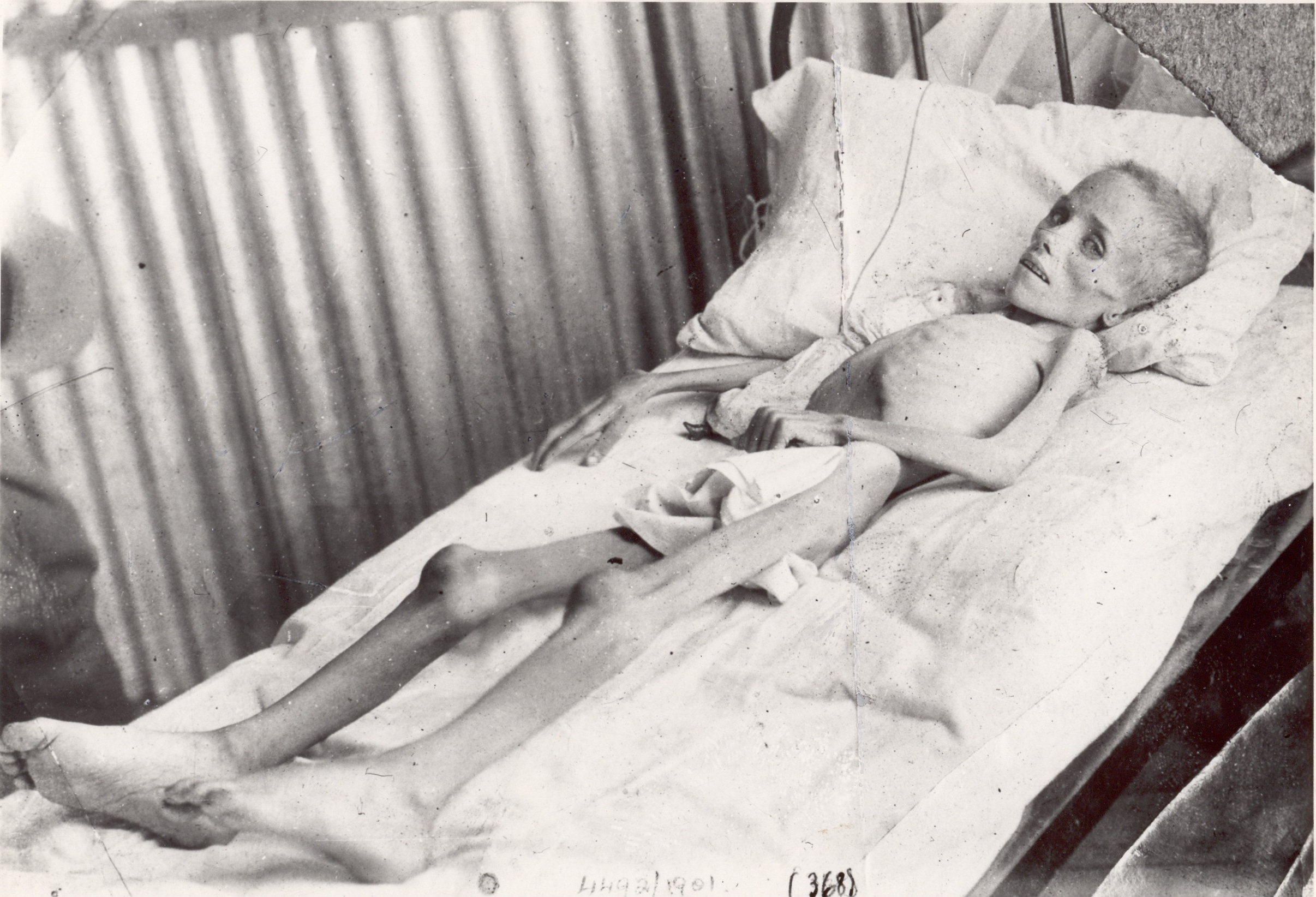
Lizzie van Zyl, visited by Emily Hobhouse in a British concentration camp.

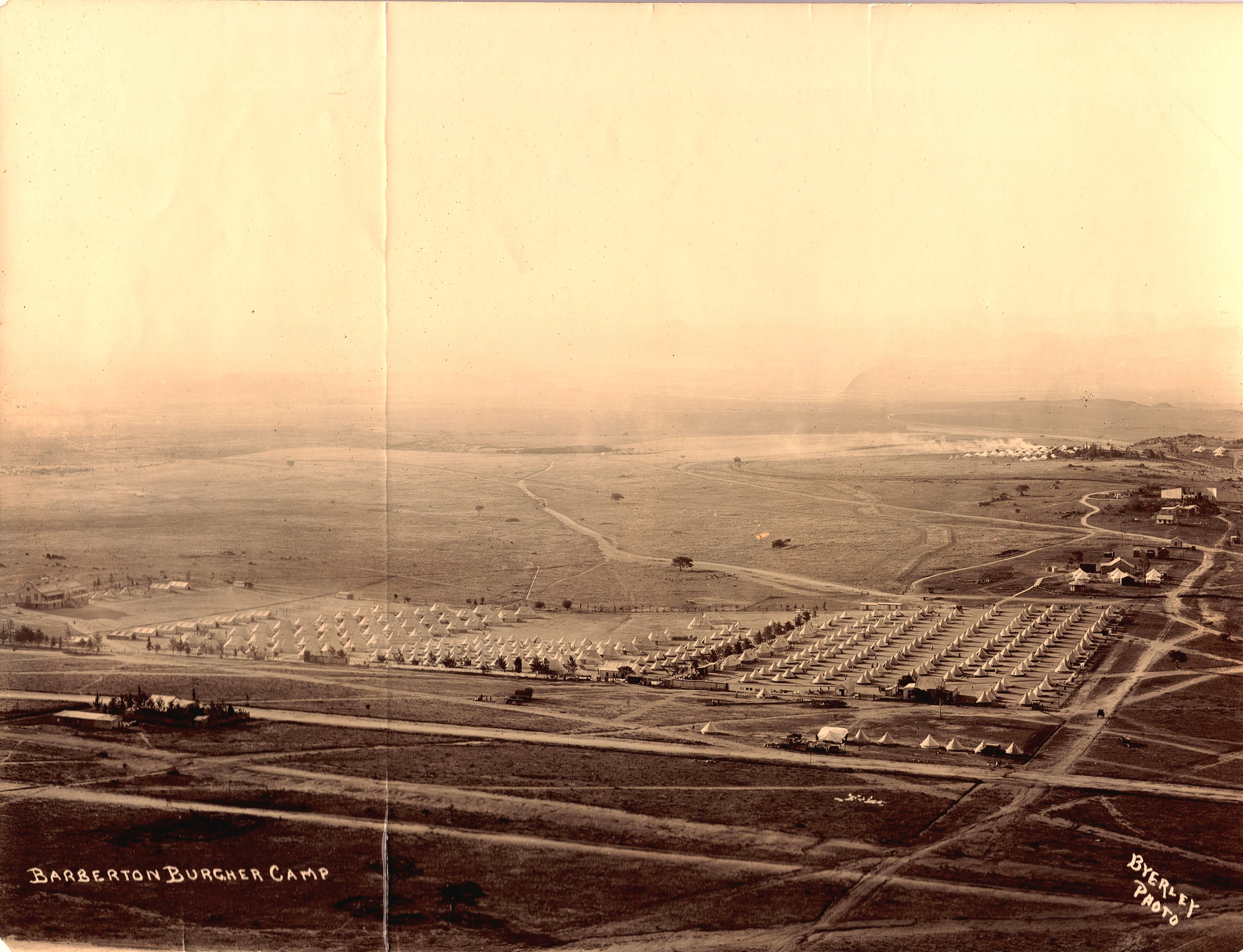
View of the Barberton camp, one of the British concentration camps during the Second Boer War, 1901

As a further strategy, General Lord Kitchener ordered the creation of concentration camps – 45 for Afrikaners and 64 for Black Africans.

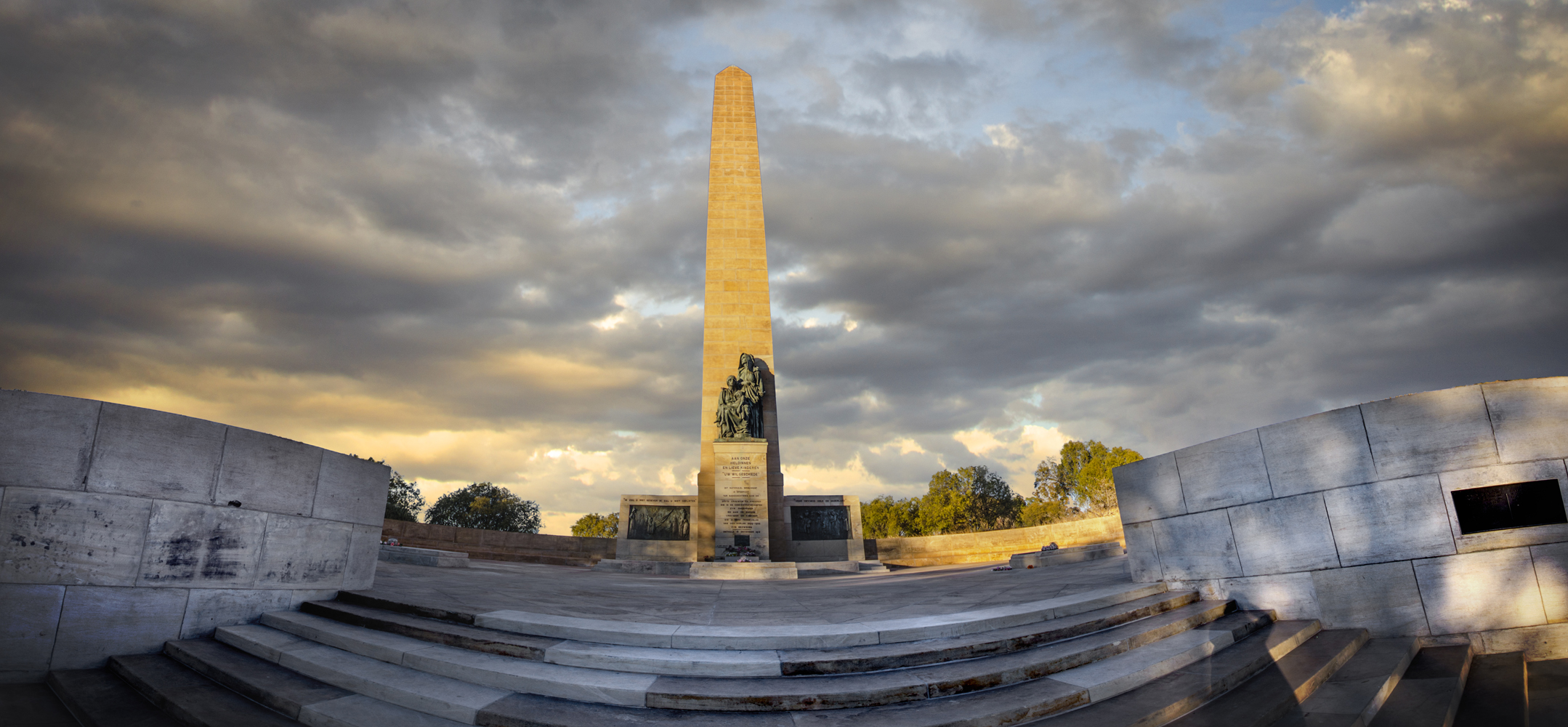
The National Women's Monument at Bloemfontein, South Africa, memorialises those who died in British concentration camps.

According to historian Thomas Pakenham, "In practice, the farms of Boer collaborators got burnt too – burnt by mistake by Tommies or in reprisal by the commandos. So Kitchener added a new twist to farm-burning. He decided that his soldiers should not only strip the farms of stock, but should take the families, too. Women and children would be concentrated in 'camps of refuge' along the railway line. In fact, these camps consisted of two kinds of civilians: genuine refugees – that is, the families of Boers who were helping the British, or at least keeping their oath of neutrality – and internees, the families of men who were still out on commando. The difference was crucial, for at first there were two different scales of rations: little enough in practice for the refugees, and a recklessly low scale for the internees."

Of the 107,000 people interned in the camps, 27,927 Boer women and children died as well as more than 14,000 Black Africans.

=== The Pietersburg war crimes trials ===
The Boer War also saw the first war crimes prosecutions in British military history. They centered around the Bushveldt Carbineers (BVC), a British Army irregular regiment of mounted rifles active in the Northern Transvaal. Originally raised in February 1901, the BVC was composed mainly of British and Commonwealth servicemen with a generous admixture of defectors from the Boer Commandos.

==== The letter ====
On 4 October 1901, a letter signed by 15 members of the Bushveldt Carbineers (BVC) garrison at Fort Edward was secretly dispatched to Col. F. H. Hall, the British Army Officer Commanding at Pietersburg. Written by BVC Trooper Robert Mitchell Cochrane, a former justice of the peace from Western Australia, the letter accused members of the Fort Edward garrison of six "disgraceful incidents":

1. The shooting of six surrendered Afrikaner men and boys and the theft of their money and livestock at Valdezia on 2 July 1901. The orders had been given by Captains Alfred Taylor and James Huntley Robertson, and relayed by Sgt. Maj. K. C. B. Morrison to Sgt. D. C. Oldham. The actual killing was alleged to have been carried out by Sgt. Oldham and BVC Troopers Eden, Arnold, Brown, Heath, and Dale.
2. The shooting of BVC Trooper B. J. van Buuren by BVC Lt. Peter Handcock on 4 July 1901. Van Buuren, an Afrikaner, had "disapproved" of the killings at Valdezia, and had informed the victims' wives and children, who were imprisoned at Fort Edward, of what had happened.
3. The revenge killing of Floris Visser, a wounded prisoner of war, near the Koedoes River on 11 August 1901. Visser had been captured by a BVC patrol let by Lieut. Harry Morant two days before his death. After Visser had been exhaustively interrogated and conveyed for 15 miles by the patrol, Lt. Morant had ordered his men to form a firing squad and shoot him. The squad consisted of BVC Troopers A. J. Petrie, J. J. Gill, Wild, and T. J. Botha. A coup de grâce was delivered by BVC Lt. Harry Picton. The slaying of Visser was in retaliation for the combat death of Morant's close friend, BVC Captain Percy Frederik Hunt, at Duivelskloof on 6 August 1901.
4. The shooting, ordered by Taylor and Morant, of four surrendered Afrikaners and four Dutch schoolteachers, who had been captured at the Elim Hospital in Valdezia, on the morning of 23 August 1901. The firing squad consisted of BVC Lt. George Witton, Sgt. D. C. Oldham, and Troopers J. T. Arnold, Edward Brown, T. Dale, and A. Heath. Although Cochrane's letter made no mention of the fact, three native South African witnesses were also shot dead.
  The ambush and fatal shooting of the Reverend Carl August Daniel Heese of the Berlin Missionary Society near Bandolierkop on the afternoon of 23 August 1901. Heese had spiritually counseled the Dutch and Afrikaner victims that morning and had angrily protested to Morant at Fort Edward upon learning of their deaths. Cochrane alleged that the killer of Heese was BVC Lt. Peter Handcock. Although Cochrane made no mention of the fact, Heese's driver, a member of the Southern Ndebele people, was also killed.
5. The orders, given by BVC Lt. Charles H. G. Hannam, to open fire on a wagon train containing Afrikaner women and children who were coming in to surrender at Fort Edward, on 5 September 1901. The ensuing gunfire led to the deaths of two boys, aged 5 and 13 years, and the wounding of a 9-year-old girl.
6. The shooting of Roelf van Staden and his sons Roelf and Christiaan, near Fort Edward on 7 September 1901. All were coming in to surrender in the hope of gaining medical treatment for teenaged Christiaan, who was suffering from recurring bouts of fever. Instead, they were met at the Sweetwaters Farm near Fort Edward by a party consisting of Morant and Handcock, joined by BVC Sgt. Maj. Hammet, MacMahon, Hodds, Botha, and Thompson. van Staden and both his sons were then shot, allegedly after being forced to dig their own graves.

The letter then accused the Field Commander of the BVC, Major Robert William Lenehan, of being "privy to these misdeamenours. It is for this reason that we have taken the liberty of addressing this communication direct to you." After listing numerous civilian witnesses who could confirm their allegations, Cochrane concluded, "Sir, many of us are Australians who have fought throughout nearly the whole war while others are Africaners who have fought from Colenso till now. We cannot return home with the stigma of these crimes attached to our names. Therefore we humbly pray that a full and exhaustive inquiry be made by Imperial officers in order that the truth be elicited and justice done. Also we beg that all witnesses may be kept in camp at Pietersburg till the inquiry is finished. So deeply do we deplore the opprobrium which must be inseparably attached to these crimes that scarcely a man once his time is up can be prevailed to re-enlist in this corps. Trusting for the credit of thinking you will grant the inquiry we seek."

==== Arrests ====
In response to the letter written by Trooper Cochrane, Col. Hall summoned all Fort Edward officers and non-commissioned officers to Pietersburg on 21 October 1901. All were met by a party of mounted infantry five miles outside Pietersburg on the morning of 23 October 1901 and "brought into town like criminals". Lt. Morant was arrested after returning from leave in Pretoria, where he had gone to settle the affairs of his deceased friend Cpt. Hunt.

==== Indictments ====
Although the trial transcripts, like almost all others dating from between 1850 and 1914, were later destroyed by the Civil Service, it is known that a Court of Inquiry, the British military's equivalent to a grand jury, was convened on 16 October 1901. The President of the Court was Col. H. M. Carter, who was assisted by Captain E. Evans and Major Wilfred N. Bolton, the provost marshal of Pietersburg. The first session of the Court took place on 6 November 1901 and continued for four weeks. Deliberations continued for a further two weeks, at which time it became clear that the indictments would be as follows:

1. In what became known as "The Six Boers Case", Captains Robertson and Taylor, as well as Sgt. Maj. Morrison, were charged with committing the offence of murder while on active service.
2. In relation to what was dubbed "The Van Buuren Incident", Maj. Lenahan was charged with, "When on active service by culpable neglect failing to make a report which it was his duty to make."
3. In relation to "The Visser Incident", Lts. Morant, Handcock, Witton, and Picton were charged with "While on active service committing the offense [sic?] of murder".
4. In relation to what was incorrectly dubbed "The Eight Boers Case", Lieuts. Morant, Handcock, and Witton were charged with, "While on active service committing the offense of murder".
  In relation to the slaying of Rev Heese, Lts. Morant and Handcock were charged with, "While on active service committing the offense of murder".
5. No charges were filed for the three children who had been shot by the Bushveldt Carbineers near Fort Edward.
6. In relation to what became known as "The Three Boers Case", Lts. Morant and Handcock were charged with, "While on active service committing the offense of murder".

==== Courts martial ====
Following the indictments, Maj. R. Whigham and Col. James St. Clair ordered Bolton to appear for the prosecution, as he was considered less expensive than hiring a barrister. Bolton vainly requested to be excused, writing, "My knowledge of law is insufficient for so intricate a matter."

The first court martial opened on 16 January 1901, with Lieut.-Col. H. C. Denny presiding over a panel of six judges. Maj. J. F. Thomas, a solicitor from Tenterfield, New South Wales, had been retained to defend Maj. Lenahan. The night before, however, he agreed to represent all six defendants.

The "Visser Incident" was the first case to go to trial. Lt. Morant's former orderly and interpreter, BVC Trooper Theunis J. Botha, testified that Visser, who had been promised that his life would be spared, was cooperative during two days of interrogation and that all his information was later found to have been true. Despite this, Lt. Morant ordered him shot.

In response, Lt. Morant testified that he only followed orders to take no prisoners as relayed to the late Captain Hunt by Col. Hubert Hamilton. He also alleged that Floris Visser had been captured wearing a British Army jacket and that Captain Hunt's body had been mutilated. In response, the court moved to Pretoria, where Col. Hamilton testified that he had "never spoken to Captain Hunt with reference to his duties in the Northern Transvaal". Though stunned, Maj. Thomas argued that his clients were not guilty because they believed that they "acted under orders". In response, Maj. Bolton argued that they were "illegal orders" and said, "The right of killing an armed man exists only so long as he resists; as soon as he submits he is entitled to be treated as a prisoner of war." The Court ruled in Maj. Bolton's favor. Lt. Morant was found guilty of murder. Lts. Handcock, Witton, and Picton were convicted of the lesser charge of manslaughter.

==== Execution ====
On 27 February 1902, two British Army Lieutenants – Anglo-Australian Harry Morant and Australian born Peter Handcock of the Bushveldt Carbineers – were executed by firing squad after being convicted of murdering eight Afrikaner POWs. This court-martial for war crimes was one of the first such prosecutions in British military history. Although Morant left a written confession in his cell, he went on to become a folk hero in modern Australia. Believed by many Australians to be the victim of a kangaroo court, public appeals have been made for Morant to be retried or pardoned. His court-martial and death have been the subject of books, a stage play, and an award-winning Australian New Wave film adaptation by director Bruce Beresford.

Witton was sentenced to death, but reprieved. Due to immense political pressure for his release, he was released after serving 32 months of a life sentence. Picton was cashiered.

== World War I ==
=== Chemical weapons usage ===
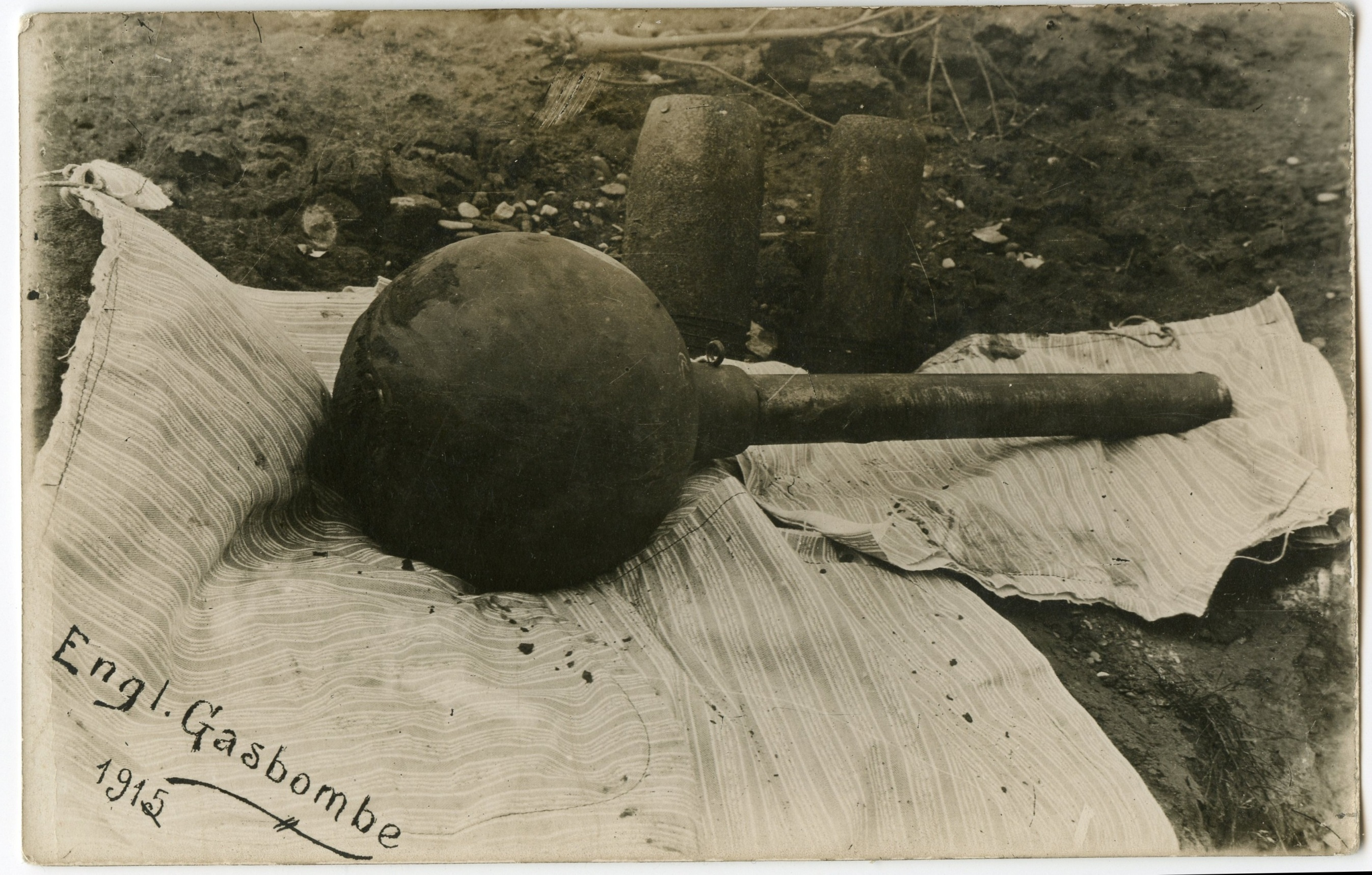
A World War I-era British gas bomb

The production and use of chemical weapons was strictly prohibited by the 1899 Hague Declaration Concerning Asphyxiating Gases and the 1907 Hague Convention on Land Warfare, which explicitly forbade the use of "poison or poisoned weapons" in warfare.

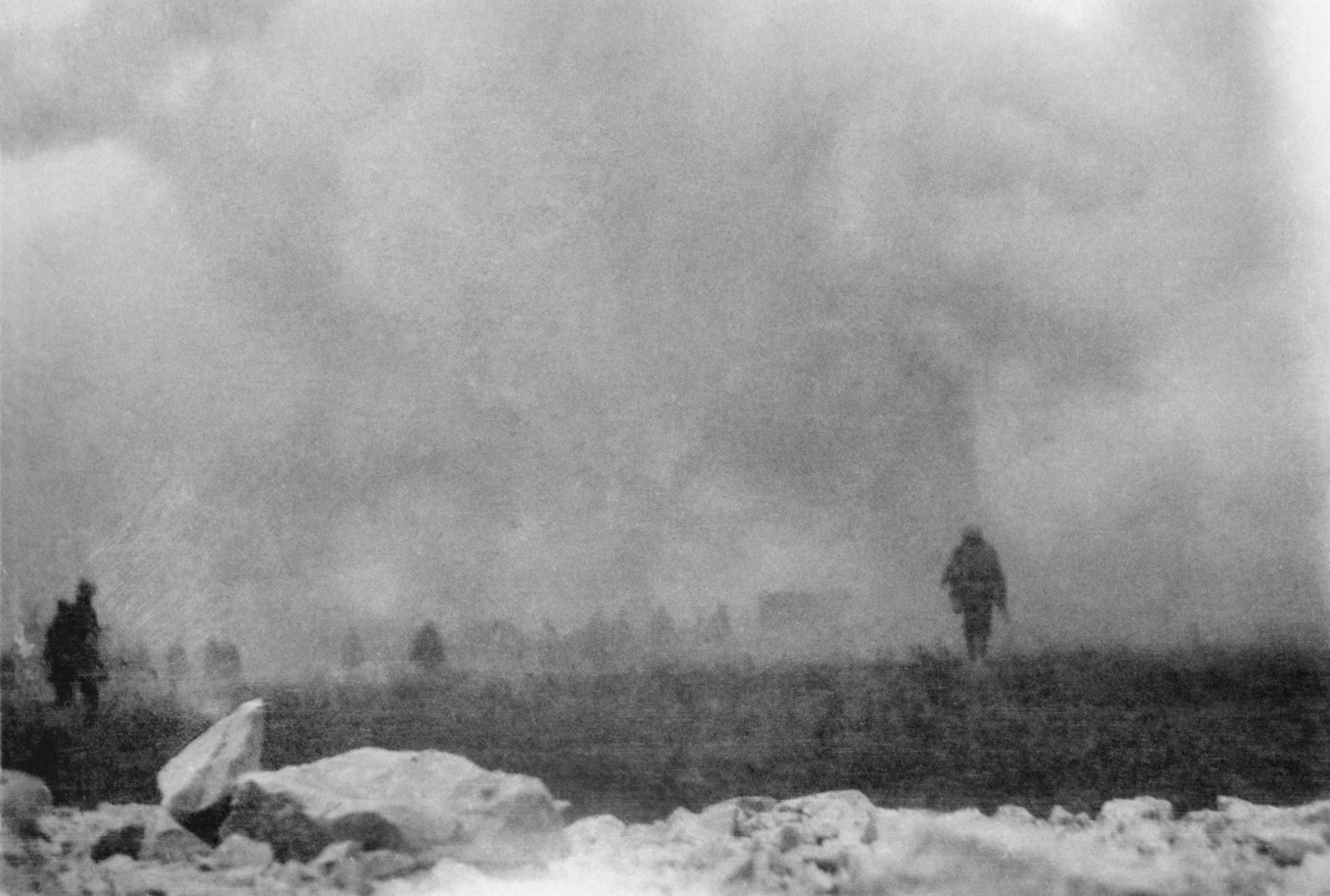
British infantry advancing through gas at Loos, 25 September 1915

The British Expeditionary Force first used chemical weapons along the Western Front at the Battle of Loos. On the first day of the Battle, Chlorine gas, codenamed Red Star, was deployed (140 tons arrayed in 5,100 gas cylinders) and aimed at the German Sixth Army's positions on the Hohenzollern Redoubt. The wind, however, proved fickle and the gas either lingered in no man's land or blew right back into British trenches.

Following the Imperial German Army's use of poison gas at Ypres, the commander of II Corps, Lieutenant General Sir Charles Ferguson, had said of poison gas:

It is a cowardly form of warfare which does not commend itself to me or other English soldiers ... We cannot win this war unless we kill or incapacitate more of our enemies than they do of us, and if this can only be done by our copying the enemy in his choice of weapons, we must not refuse to do so.

=== Blockade of Germany ===
According to author Alan Kramer, "The dominant scholarly (and popular) view is that the blockade was illegal and led to serious food shortages causing the mass starvation of German civilians". The British policy is also described as illegal by other analysts and "a violation of the maritime law".

The agreed but unratified London Declaration concerning the Laws of Naval War established that the only legal blockade was the close blockade of enemy ports, and not the long-distance blockade set up by Britain. This was so that blockades must be "effective", a clear stop on traffic, so as to avoid creating uncertainty and infringing on neutral rights. Further, after a series of tit-for-tat steps, the blockade was broadened to essentially all goods. This was contrary to the intent of the Declaration, which assumed a strict distinction between cargo of a military nature or destination and civilian items. Neutral powers, including the United States, disputed the legality of the blockade during the first stages of the war and sent protest notes to the British government. However, later in the war as a belligerent the US helped enforce the blockade rigorously, while neutral powers co-operated with the allies.

A 1928 German academic study, sponsored by the Carnegie Endowment for International Peace, provided a thorough analysis of the German civilian deaths during the war. The study estimated 424,000 war-related deaths of civilians over the age of one in Germany, not including Alsace-Lorraine, and the authors attributed the civilian deaths over the prewar level primarily to food and fuel shortages in 1917–1918.

=== Treatment of U-boat crews ===
To counter the submarine threat, the British armed merchant vessels for self defense and instructed civilian captains to evade submarines, or if the circumstances arise, to steer towards submarines on the surface in front of the ship to force them to submerge and call off their attack. This latter instruction was interpreted as a suggestion to ram submarines, and overall the British efforts were challenged during the war as blurring the line between civilian and military vessels, potentially removing the protection afforded to civilian ships under international law. The Germans were aware of this, but being intent on unrestricted warfare, did not make an emphatic point of it, though civilian merchant seaman Charles Fryatt was executed for "illegal civilian warfare."

Less legally grey were incidents of atrocities by the Royal Navy. According to Article 16 of Hague X: "After every engagement, the two belligerents, so far as military interests permit, shall take steps to look for the shipwrecked, sick, and wounded, and to protect them, as well as the dead, against pillage and ill treatment." This convention was not ratified by the United Kingdom, though large numbers of U-boat crew were rescued and captured as POW interrogations were often an important source of military intelligence. However, there were a number of notable incidents where Royal Navy officers are alleged to have massacred unarmed U-boat crew-members after their submarines were sunk. Some major incidents are listed below.

==== SM U-27 ====
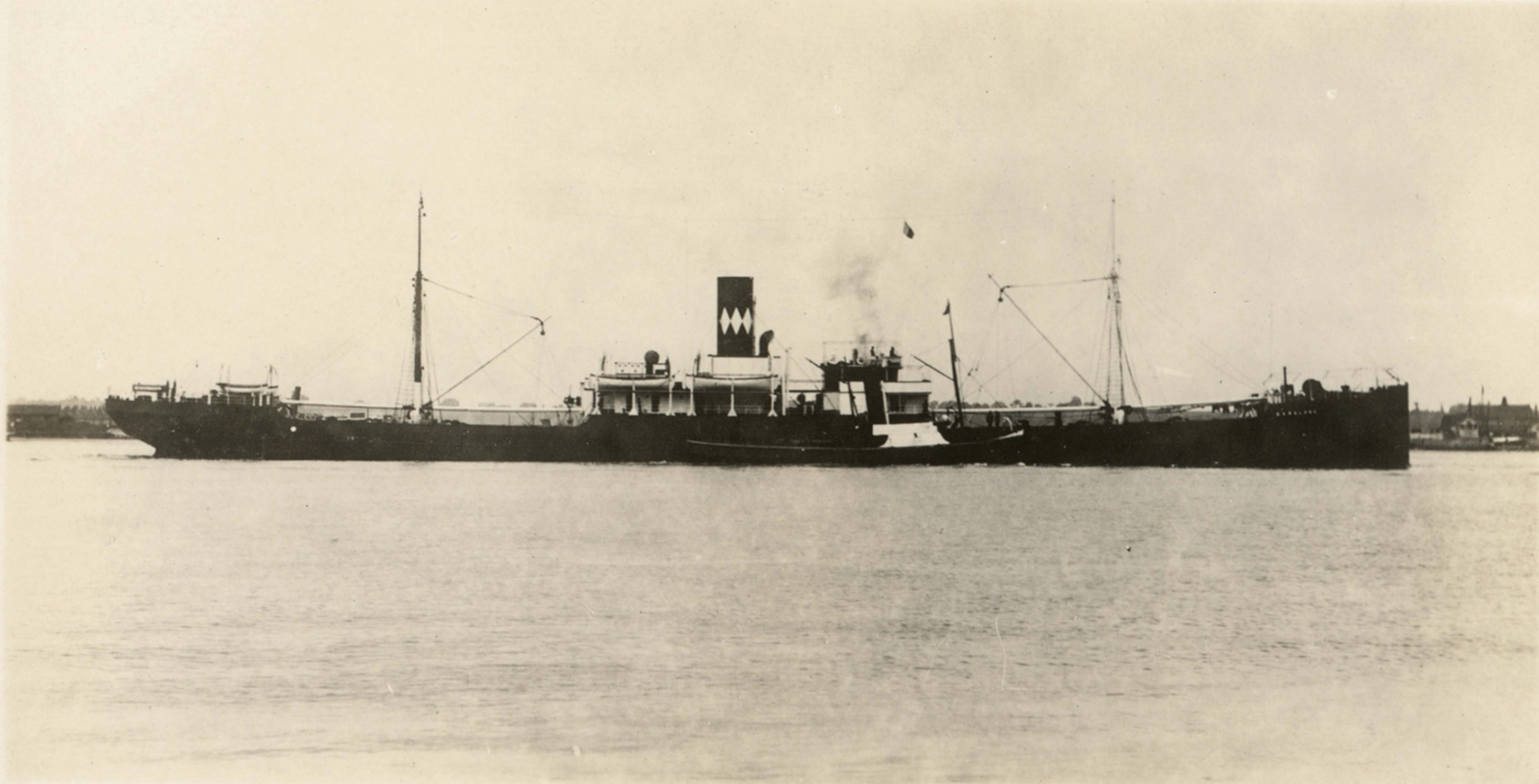
HMS Baralong

After the sinking of RMS Lusitania by the German submarine SM U-20 in May 1915, Lieutenant-Commander Godfrey Herbert, commanding officer of the Q-ship HMS Baralong, was visited by two officers of the Admiralty's Secret Service branch at the Royal Navy's base at Spike Island, near Queenstown, Ireland. He was told, "This Lusitania business is shocking. Unofficially, we are telling you ... take no prisoners from U-boats."

On 19 August 1915, the German submarine U-27 sighted the British freighter Nicosian, 70 nautical miles off the coast of Queenstown. Unlike the German submarine commanders who had recently sunk the Lusitania and the S.S. Arabic, the U-27's commanding officer, Kapitänleutnant Bernhard Wegener, decided to attack in compliance with cruiser rules. U-27 surfaced, stopped the ship with a warning shot, and ordered the Nicosian's captain and crew to take to the lifeboats. Nicosian was loaded with mules bound for the British Expeditionary Force in France. Wegener commenced firing at Nicosian (which may or may not still have had crew remaining on board), but then the Baralong arrived, flying the neutral American flag as a ruse of war. After steaming into firing range, lowering the American flag, and raising the British White Ensign in its place, Baralong's crew opened fire and sank the U-27.

Twelve German sailors survived the U-27's sinking: the crews of her two deck guns and the sailors who had been on the conning tower. They swam to Nicosian, attempting to climb up her hanging lifeboat falls (Note: The ropes by which a boat is lowered from the deck of a ship to the water) and pilot ladder. Herbert ordered his men to open fire with small arms on the men in the water.

After a few German survivors managed to climb aboard the Nicosian, Herbert sent Baralong's 12 Royal Marines, under the command of a Corporal Collins, to board the sinking vessel. The German sailors were discovered in the engine room and shot on sight. According to Sub-Lieutenant Gordon Steele: "Wegener ran to a cabin on the upper deck – I later found out it was Manning's bathroom. The marines broke down the door with the butts of their rifles, but Wegener squeezed through a scuttle and dropped into the sea. He still had his life-jacket on and put up his arms in surrender. Corporal Collins, however, took aim and shot him through the head." Collins later recalled that, after Wegener's murder, Herbert threw a revolver in the German captain's face and screamed, "What about the Lusitania, you bastard!"

After the Nicosian's crew arrived at Liverpool, however, the American members of the crew gave sworn testimony to the United States Consul about the massacre of U-27's crew. After their return to the United States, they repeated their testimony to American newspapers and before a notary public at the Imperial German Consulate in New Orleans. As a result, the US State Department forwarded a formal protest by the German Empire to the British Foreign Office.

The memorandum demanded that "Captain William McBride" and the crew of HMS Baralong be court-martialed and threatened to "take the serious decision of retribution" if the massacre of U-27's crew went unprosecuted.

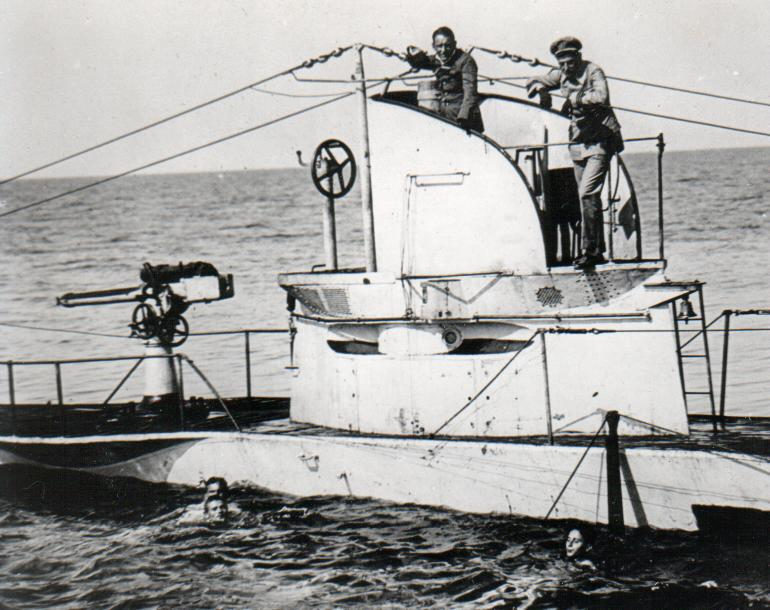
SMS U-27 with members of her crew

Sir Edward Grey, replied through the U.S. State Department, "His Majesty's Government do not think it necessary to make any reply to the suggestion that the British navy has been guilty of inhumanity, according to the latest figures available, the number of German sailors rescued from drowning, often in circumstances of great difficulty and peril, amounts to 1,150. The German navy can show no such record – perhaps through want of opportunity."

Sir Edward further argued that the alleged massacre of U-27's unarmed sailors could be grouped with three German attacks on unarmed sailors in the same 48 hours: the Imperial German Navy's sinking of SS Arabic, their attack on a stranded British submarine in neutral Dutch territorial waters, and their attack on the crew of the steamship Ruel after they had abandoned ship. In conclusion, Grey suggested that all four incidents be placed before a tribunal chaired by the United States Navy. This was rejected by German authorities.

A German medal was issued commemorating the incident.

==== SM U-41 ====
On 24 September 1915 HMS Baralong also sank U-41, which was in the process of sinking the cargo ship Urbino. According to the two German survivors, Baralong continued to fly the American flag after opening fire on U-41 and then rammed the lifeboat carrying the German survivors, causing it to sink. The only witnesses to the second attack were the German and British sailors present. Oberleutnant zur See Iwan Crompton, after returning to Germany from a prisoner-of-war camp, reported that Baralong had run down the lifeboat he was in; he leapt clear and was shortly after taken prisoner. The British crew denied that they had rammed the lifeboat. Crompton later published an account of U-41's exploits in 1917, U-41: der zweite Baralong-Fall (Eng: "The second Baralong case").

==== SM UB-110 ====
On 19 July 1918, while under the command of Kapitänleutnant Werner Fürbringer, SM UB-110 was depth charged, rammed, and sunk near the Tyne by HMS Garry, commanded by Charles Lightoller. This was possibly the last U-boat sinking during the Great War.

In his postwar memoirs, Fürbringer alleged that, after the sinking, HMS Garry hove to and opened fire with revolvers and machine guns on the unarmed shipwreck survivors in the water. He states that he saw the skull of his 18-year-old steward split open by a lump of coal hurled by a member of Garry's crew. He also states that when he attempted to help a wounded officer to swim, the man said, "Let me die in peace. The swine are going to murder us anyhow." The memoir states that the shooting ceased only when the convoy that the destroyer had been escorting, and that contained many neutral-flagged ships, arrived on the scene, at which point "as if by magic the British now let down some life boats into the water."

While Lightoller does not mention any massacre in his own recounting of the sinking, he does state that he "refused to accept the hands up air" business. Lightoller explained, "In fact it was simply amazing that they should have had the infernal audacity to offer to surrender, in view of their ferocious and pitiless attacks on our merchant ships. Destroyer versus Destroyer, as in the Dover Patrol, was fair game and no favour. One could meet them and take them on as a decent antagonist. But towards the submarine men, one felt an utter disgust and loathing; they were nothing but an abomination, polluting the clean sea." Lightoller claimed that he simply "left the rescue work to the others", and was more concerned about his own ship, which took serious damage in the ramming.

Lieutenant Commander Lightoller was awarded a bar to his Distinguished Service Cross for sinking UB-110. Contradictory information exists about the numbers of UB-110's crew lost, with Lightoller claiming 15 survivors with 13 lost, while a German account claims 13 survivors with 21 lost, most in the post-battle massacre. Some historians suggest that Lightoller and his ship was not responsible for the killings, but rather it was due to the actions of small motor launches of the Auxiliary Patrol. It is significant, however, that local newspaper accounts of the action trumpet several German survivors were taken afterwards to hospital with gunshot wounds.

=== German investigation of British war crimes ===
According to American legal scholar Alfred de Zayas, the Prussian Ministry of War established the "Military Bureau for the Investigation of Violations of the Laws of War", (German: Militäruntersuchungstelle für Verletzungen des Kriegsrechts) on 19 October 1914. The Bureau's stated purpose was "to determine violations of the laws and customs of war which enemy military and civilian persons have committed against the Prussian troops and to investigate whatever accusations of this nature are made against by the enemy against members of the Prussian Army."

The Military Bureau "had wide competence to establish facts in a judicial manner and to secure the evidence necessary for legal analysis of each case. Witnesses were interrogated and their sworn depositions taken by military judges; lists of suspected war criminals were compiled, which would probably have led to criminal proceedings if the German Empire had won the war. The material remained largely secret, though some excerpts from witness depositions were used in German white books." In these publicized pieces of propaganda, "adjustments" were made to make the material more convincing, making the white books significantly less reliable than the original accounts.

By the summer of 1918, the Military Bureau had documented 355 separate incidents of violations of the laws and customs of war by British servicemen along the Western Front.

The Military Bureau also compiled a thirteen-page "Black List of Englishmen who are guilty of violations of the laws of war vis a vis members of the German Armed Forces" (German: Schwarze Liste derjenigen Engländer, die sie während des Krieges gegenüber deutschen Heeresangehörigen völkerechtwidringen Verhaltens schuldig gemacht haben). The list, which survived the Allied firebombing of Berlin and Potsdam during the Second World War, contains a total of 39 names, including "Captain McBride" of HMS Baralong. In contrast, however, nine similar lists survive of alleged French war criminals and consist of 400 names.

Also following the Armistice, the victorious Allies pooled their reports, compiled a joint list of alleged German war crimes, and demanded the extradition of 900 alleged war criminals for trial in France and the United Kingdom. As this proved unacceptable to the German electorate, the Government of the Weimar Republic agreed to try them domestically in the Leipzig War Crimes Trials. According to de Zayas, however, "Generally speaking, the German population took exception to these trials, especially because the Allies were not similarly bringing their own soldiers to justice."

All except 11 volumes of the German Bureau's World War I archives were destroyed during the 1945 Allied bombing raids on Berlin and Potsdam.

== World War II ==
=== Attack on neutral powers ===
The British violated the neutrality of several countries on a number of occasions, including:

- Anglo-Soviet invasion of Iran
- British invasion of Iceland
- Psilander affair
- Altmark incident
- British occupation of the Faroe Islands
- Operation Postmaster

=== Crimes against enemy combatants and civilians ===
==== Looting ====
In violation of the Hague Conventions, British troops conducted small scale looting in Normandy following their liberation. On 21 April 1945, British soldiers randomly selected and burned two cottages in Seedorf, Germany, in reprisal against local civilians who had hidden German soldiers in their cellars. On 23 May 1945, British troops in Schleswig-Holstein were alleged to have plundered Glücksburg castle, stealing jewellery, and desecrating 38 coffins from the castle's mausoleum. Historian Sean Longden claims that violence against German prisoners and civilians who refused to cooperate with the British army "could be ignored or made light of".

Earlier in the war, during the Allied retreat from Belgium in May 1940, a British army detachment withdrawing from the area and in the process of blowing up a bridge at Menen, required furniture from a restaurant in order to set up a barricade. The establishment was owned by Julian Vaervecke, a retired road bicycle racing star, who refused permission. The situation heated up because the bad temper of Vervaecke, added to the fact that he speak a poor English. He was arrested by the soldiers, taken to Park Torris in Roncq and shot dead.

==== Torture of POWs ====
An MI19 prisoner of war facility, known as the "London Cage", was utilised during and immediately after the war. This facility has been the subject of allegations of torture. The Bad Nenndorf interrogation centre, in occupied Germany, managed by the Combined Services Detailed Interrogation Centre, was the subject of an official inquiry in 1947. It found that there was "mental and physical torture during the interrogations".

==== Rapes ====
Rape was committed by British troops during the British advance towards Germany. During late 1944, with the army based across Belgium and the Netherlands, soldiers were billeted with local families or befriended them. In December 1944, it came to the attention of the authorities that there was a "rise of indecency with children" where abusers had exploited the "atmosphere of trust" that had been created with local families. While the army "attempted to investigate allegations, and some men were convicted, it was an issue that received little publicity." Rape also occurred once British forces had entered Germany. Many rapes involved alcohol, but there were also instances of premeditated attacks. For example, on a single day in April 1945, three women in Neustadt am Rübenberge were raped. In the village of Oyle, near Nienburg, two soldiers attempted to coerce two girls into a nearby wood. When they refused, one was grabbed and dragged into the woods. When she began to scream, in according to Longden, "one of the soldiers pulled a gun to silence her. Whether intentionally or in error the gun went off hitting her in the throat and killing her."

Sean Longden highlights that "Some officers failed to treat reports of rape with gravity." He provides the example of a medic, who had a rape reported to him. In cooperation with the Royal Military Police, they were able to track down and apprehend the perpetrators who were then identified by the victim. When the two culprits "were taken before their CO. His response was alarming. He insisted since the men were going on leave no action could be taken and that his word was final."

==== Bombing of Dresden ====
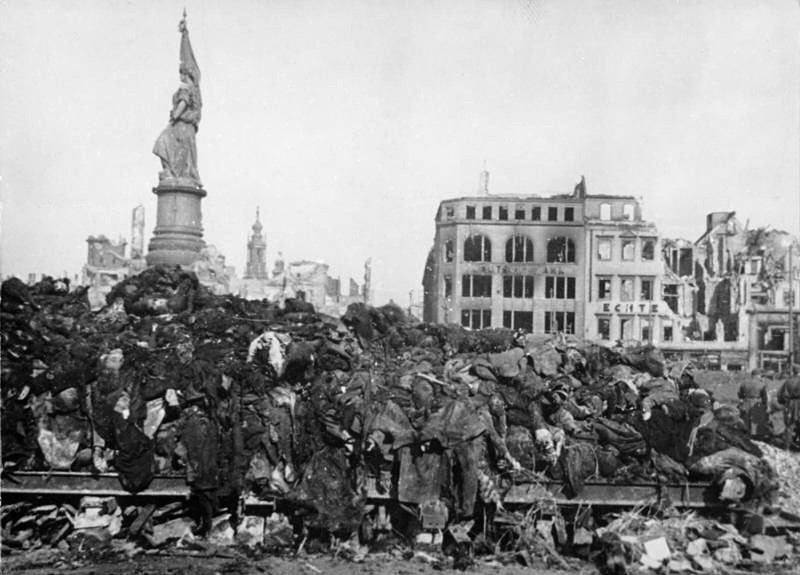
Dead civilians at Dresden after the 1945 bombing

The British, with other allied nations (mainly the U.S.) carried out air raids against enemy cities during World War II, including the bombing of the German city of Dresden, which killed around 25,000 people. While "no agreement, treaty, convention or any other instrument governing the protection of the civilian population or civilian property" from aerial attack was adopted before the war, the Hague Conventions did prohibit the bombardment of undefended towns. The city, largely untouched by the war, had functioning rail communications to the Eastern front and was an industrial centre. A USAF historical analysis concluded that Dresden was "a legitimate military target".

When asked whether the bombing of Dresden was a war crime, British historian Frederick Taylor replied: "I really don't know. From a practical point of view, rules of war are something of a grey area. It was pretty borderline stuff in terms of the extent of the raid and the amount of force used." Historian Donald Bloxham claims that "the bombing of Dresden on 13–14 February 1945 was a war crime". He further argues that there was a strong prima facie for trying Winston Churchill among others and that there is theoretical case that he could have been found guilty. "This should be a sobering thought. If, however it is also a startling one, this is probably less the result of widespread understanding of the nuance of international law and more because in the popular mind 'war criminal', like 'paedophile' or 'terrorist', has developed into a moral rather than a legal categorisation."

The bombing of Dresden has been politicised by Holocaust deniers and pro-Nazi apologists—most notably in British writer David Irving's The Destruction of Dresden—in an attempt to establish a moral equivalence between Nazi war crimes and the killing of German civilians by Allied bombing raids.

=== War crimes at sea ===
==== Unrestricted submarine warfare ====
On 4 May 1940, in response to Germany's intensive unrestricted submarine warfare, during the Battle of the Atlantic and its invasion of Denmark and Norway, the Royal Navy conducted its own unrestricted submarine campaign. The Admiralty announced that all vessels in the Skagerrak, even the neutral ones, were to be sunk on sight without warning. This was contrary to the terms of the Second London Naval Treaty.

==== Shootings of shipwreck survivors ====
According to Alfred de Zayas, there are numerous documented cases of the Royal Navy and Royal Air Force deliberately firing upon shipwreck survivors.

In July 1941, the submarine HMS Torbay, under Lieutenant Commander Anthony Miers, was based in the Mediterranean where it sank several German ships. On two occasions, once off the coast of Alexandria, Egypt, and the other off the coast of Crete, the crew fired upon shipwrecked German sailors and troops. Miers made no attempt to hide his actions, and reported them in his official logs. He received a strongly worded reprimand from his superiors following the first incident. Mier's actions violated the Hague Convention of 1907, which banned the killing of shipwreck survivors under any circumstances.

==== Attacks against non-combatant ships ====
- See List of hospital ships sunk in World War II

On 10 September 1942, the Italian hospital ship Arno was torpedoed and sunk by Royal Air Force torpedo bombers north-east of Ras el Tin, near Tobruk. The British alleged that a decoded German radio message intimated that the vessel was carrying supplies to the Axis troops. HS Po had been lost at Valona, in the Adriatic Sea to British torpedo bombers on 14 March 1941 and HS California off Syracuse on 11 August 1942.

On 18 November 1944, the German hospital ship HS Tübingen was sunk by two Bristol Beaufighter bombers off Pola, in the Adriatic Sea. The vessel had paid a brief visit to the Allied-controlled port of Bari to pick up German wounded under the auspices of the Red Cross; despite the calm sea and the good weather that allowed a clear identification of the ship's Red Cross markings, it was attacked with rockets nine times. Six crewmembers were killed. American author and historian Alfred M. de Zayas identifies the sinking of Tübingen and other German and Italian hospital ships as war crimes.

== Malaya ==
=== Batang Kali massacre ===
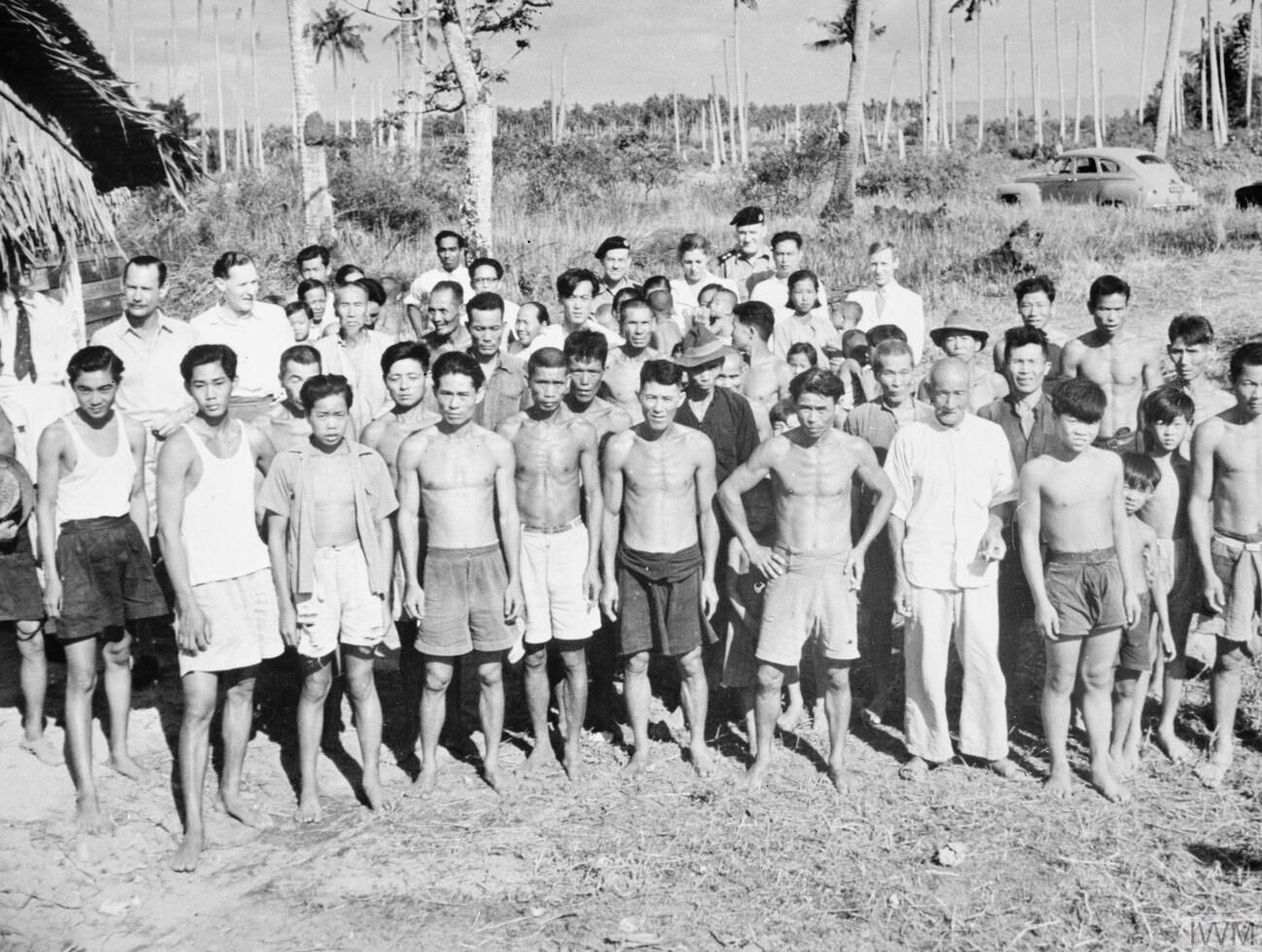
Civilians forcefully evicted from their land by the British military during the Malayan Emergency

On 12 December 1948, during the Malayan Emergency, the Batang Kali massacre took place which involved the killing of 24 villagers. Six of the eight British soldiers involved were interviewed under caution by detectives. They corroborated accounts that the villagers were unarmed, were not insurgents nor trying to escape, and had been unlawfully killed on the order of the two sergeants in command. The sergeants denied the allegations. The Government's position was that if anyone is to be held responsible, it should be the Sultan of Selangor.

=== Internment camps ===
As part of the Briggs Plan devised by British General Sir Harold Briggs, 500,000 people (roughly ten per cent of Malaya's population) were eventually removed from the land, had tens of thousands of their homes destroyed, and were interned in 450 guarded fortified camps called "New Villages". The intent of this measure was to inflict collective punishments on villages where people were deemed to be aiding the insurgents and to isolate the population from contact with insurgents. The British also tried to win the hearts of the internees by providing them with education and health services as well as piped water and electricity within the villages. This practice was prohibited by the Geneva Conventions and customary international law which stated that the destruction of property must not happen unless rendered absolutely necessary by military operations.

According to British historian John Newsinger, people transferred to live in the New Villages were "effectively deprived of all civil rights"; John D. Leary in his study of the Orang Asli during the Emergency argued that the forced resettlement used to create the New Villages brought "misery, disease and death" to many Malaysians.

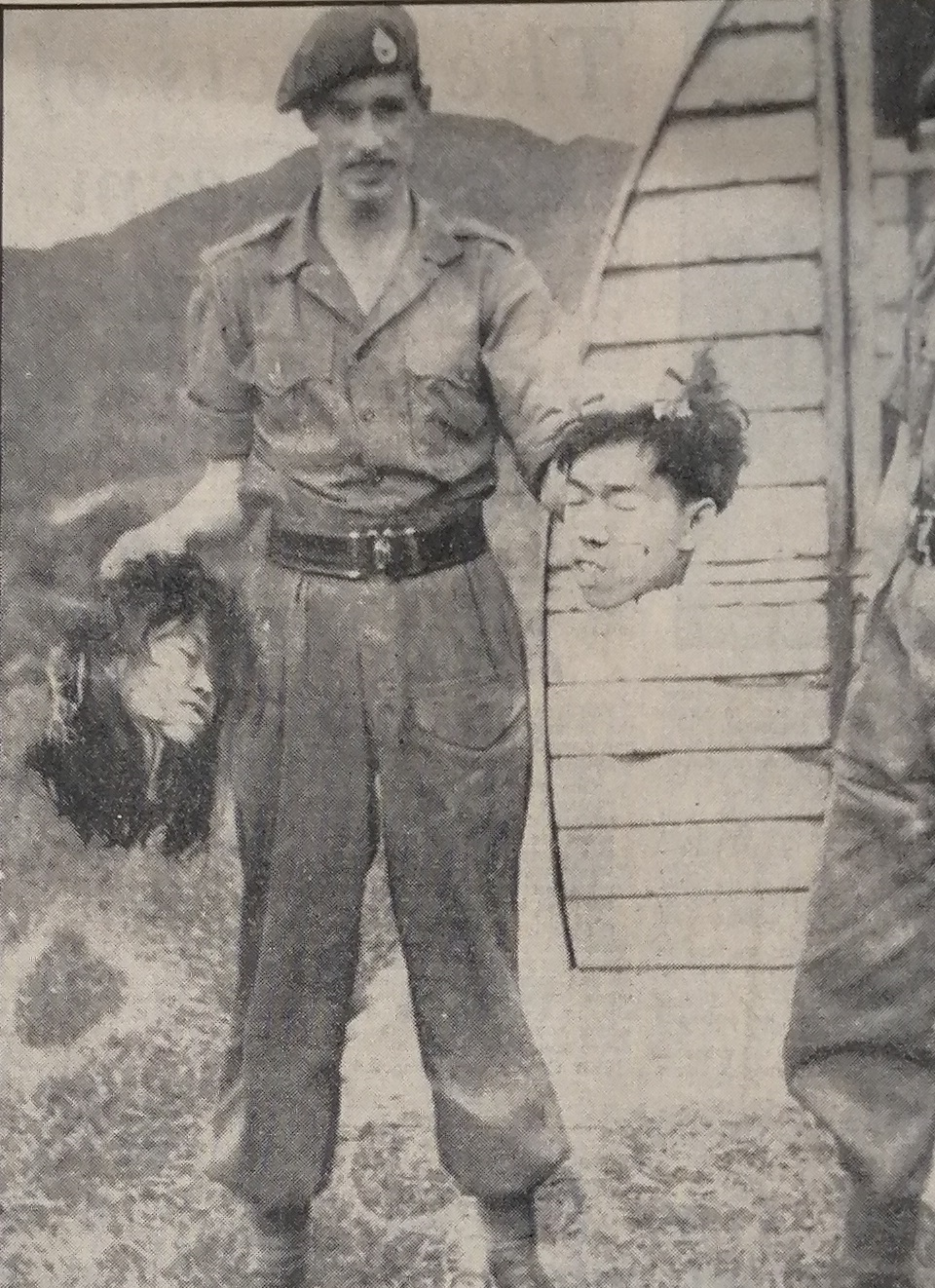
Royal Marine poses holding severed heads during the Malayan Emergency

=== Headhunting and scalping ===
During the war, British and Commonwealth forces hired Iban (Dyak) headhunters from Borneo to decapitate suspected MNLA members, arguing that this was done for identification purposes. Iban headhunters were also permitted by British military leaders to take the scalps of corpses to be kept as trophies. However, in practice this led to British troops taking the severed heads of Malayan people as trophies. After the practice of headhunting in Malaya by Ibans had been exposed to the public, the Foreign Office first tried to deny that the practice existed, before then trying to justify Iban headhunting and conduct damage control in the press. Privately, the Colonial Office noted that "there is no doubt that under international law a similar case in wartime would be a war crime". One of the trophy heads was later found to have been displayed in a British regimental museum.

In 1952, April, the British communist newspaper the Daily Worker (today known as the Morning Star) published a photograph of British Royal Marines in a British military base in Malaya openly posing with decapitated human heads. Initially British government spokespersons belonging to the Admiralty and the Colonial Office claimed the photograph was fake. In response to the accusations that their headhunting photograph was fake, the Daily Worker released yet another photograph taken in Malaya showing British soldiers posing with a severed head. However, Colonial Secretary Oliver Lyttelton (after confirmation from Field-Marshal Gerald Templer) confirmed to parliament that the photos were indeed genuine. In response to the Daily Worker articles exposing the decapitation of MNLA suspects, the practice was banned by Winston Churchill who feared that such photographs would give ammunition to communist propaganda.

Despite the shocking imagery of the photographs of headhunting by British soldiers in Malaya, the Daily Worker was the only newspaper to publish them and the photographs were virtually ignored by the mainstream British press.

=== Malayan Emergency gallery ===
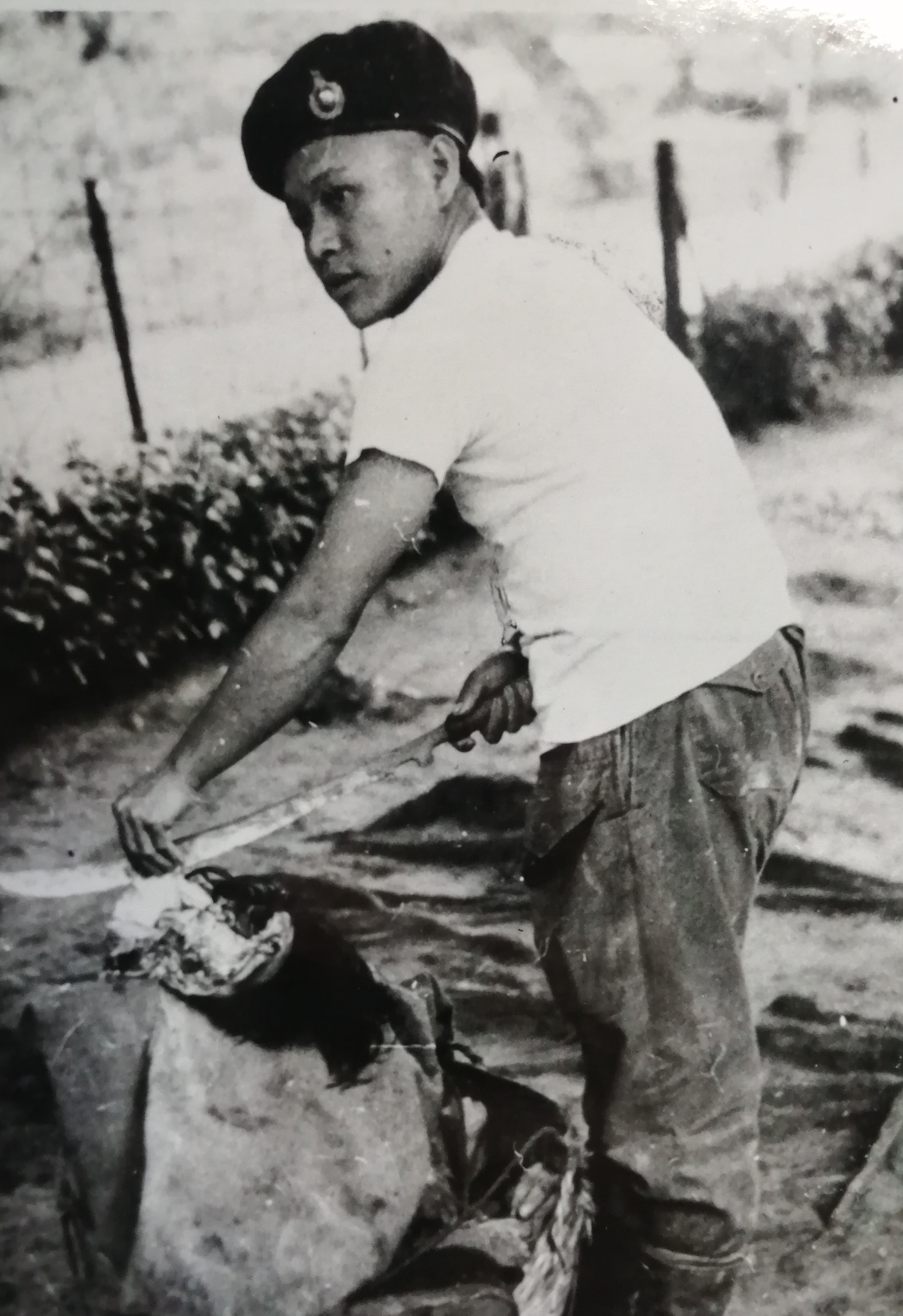
An Iban headhunter wearing a Royal Marine beret prepares a human scalp above a basket of human body parts.

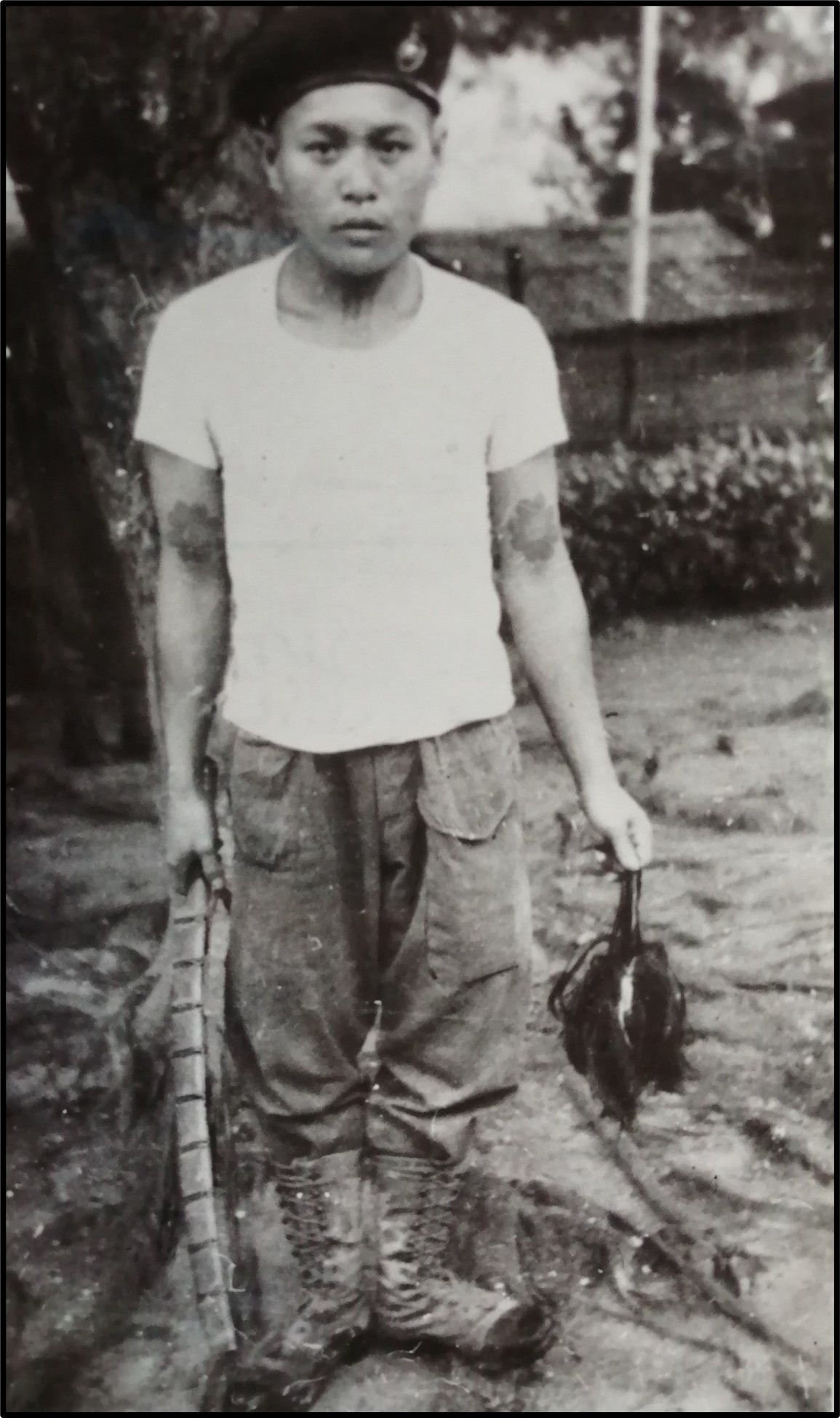
An Iban headhunter posing with a human scalp

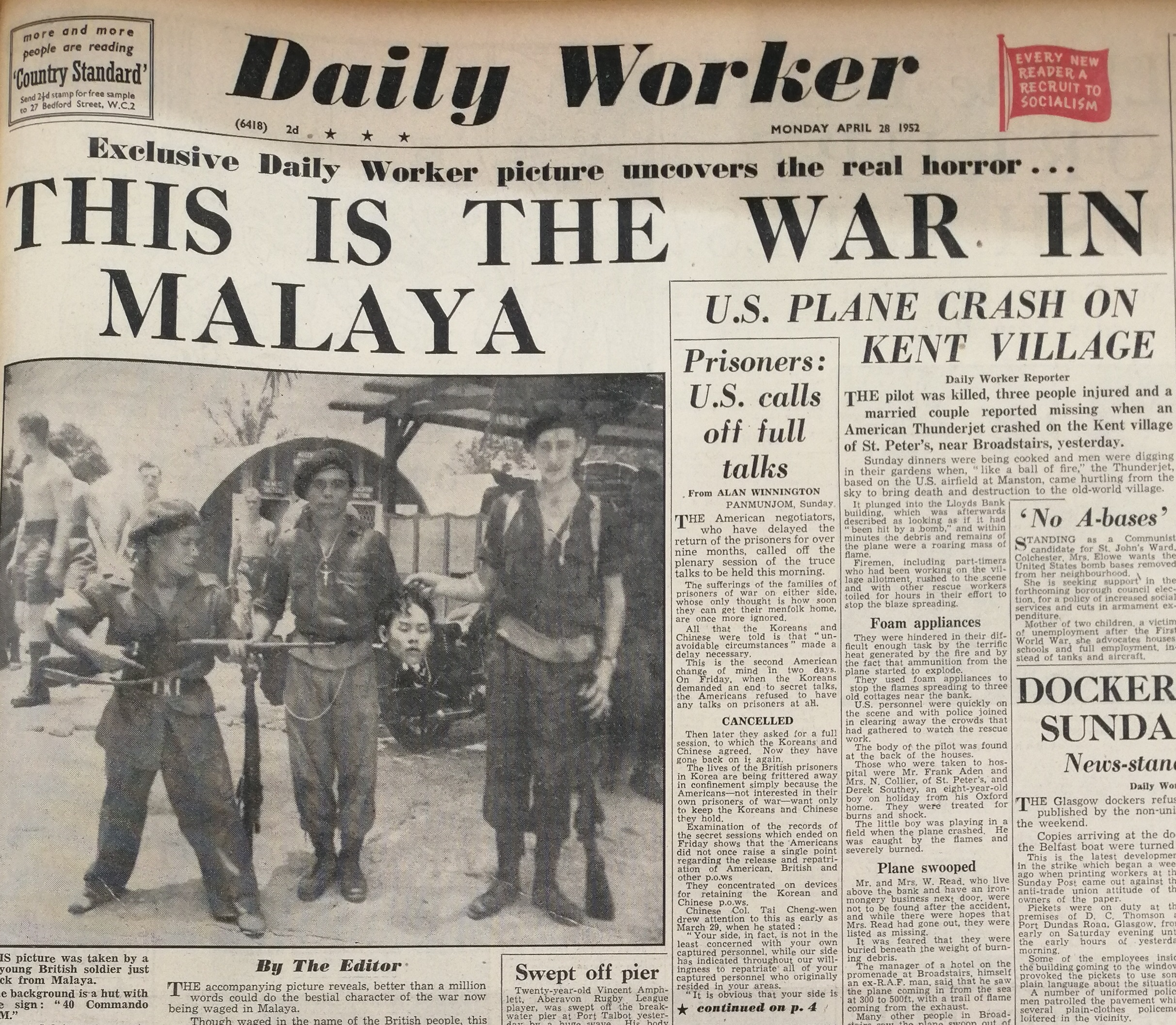
The Daily Worker exposes the practice of headhunting among British troops in Malaya. 28 April 1952.

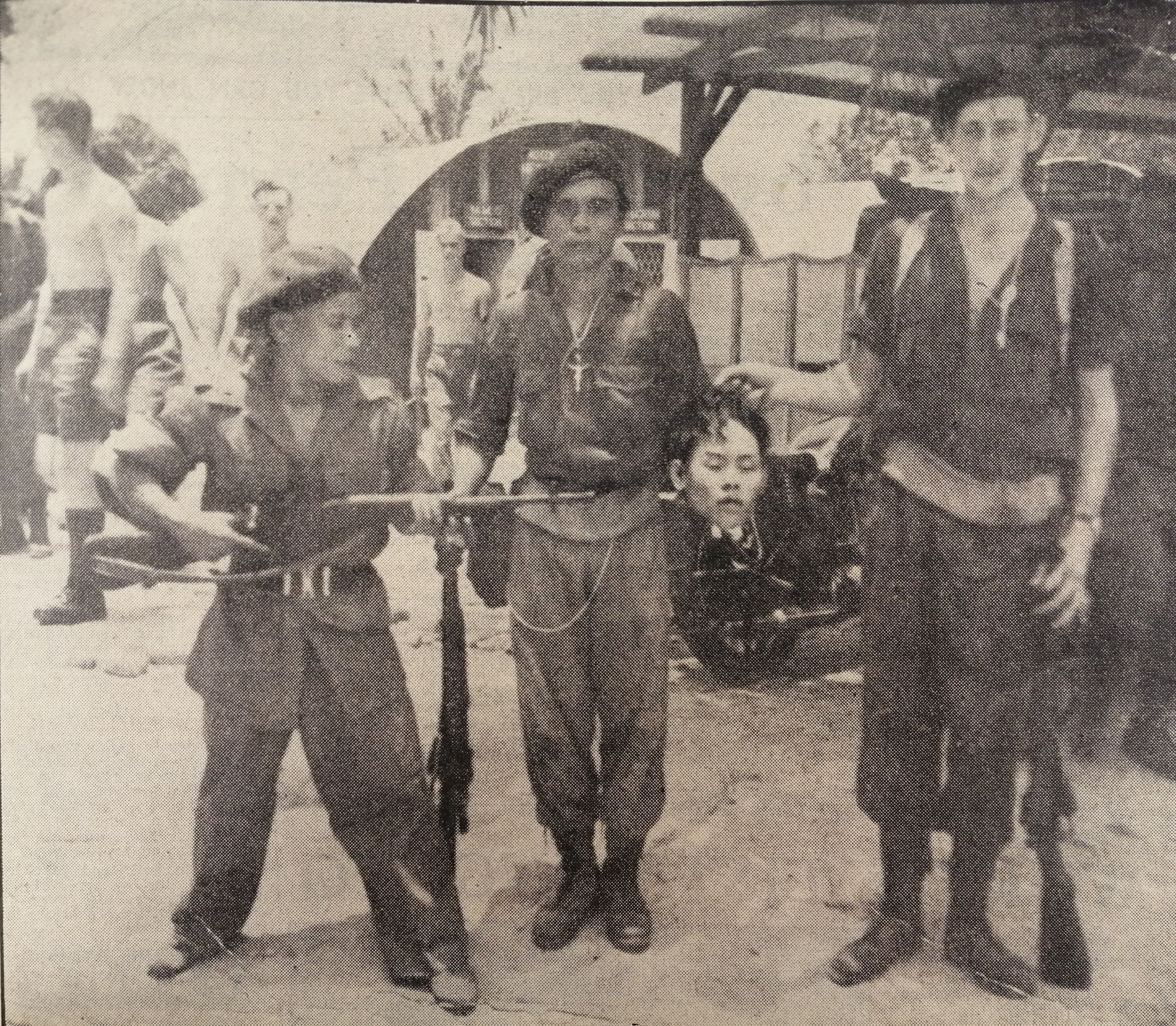
Commonwealth soldiers in a British military base pose with a severed head

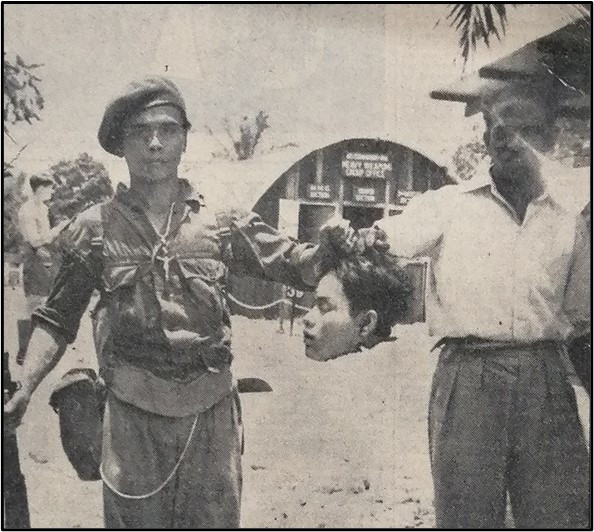
Commonwealth soldiers pose with a severed head inside a British military base in Malaya during the Malayan Emergency

== Kenya ==
=== Treatment of detainees ===
Following the declaration of a state of emergency in 1952 after a period of increasing violence, Britain sought to re-impose imperial order in Kenya. In the ensuing eight-year conflict from 1952 to 1960 centred on the Kikuyu people, who found themselves fighting on both sides, many were relocated. According to British authorities 80,000 were interned, while Caroline Elkins estimated that between 160,000 and 320,000 were interned; other estimates are as high as 450,000 interned. According to David Anderson, the British hanged over 1,090 suspected rebels. Another 400 were sentenced to death but reprieved because they were under 18 or women. The British declared some areas prohibited zones where anyone could be shot. It was common for Kikuyu to be shot because they "failed to halt when challenged."

Torture and atrocities were committed during the conflict. According to Elkins:

[E]lectric shock was widely used, as well as cigarettes and fire. Bottles (often broken), gun barrels, knives, snakes, vermin, and hot eggs were thrust up men's rectums and women's vaginas. The screening teams whipped, shot, burned and mutilated Mau Mau suspects, ostensibly to gather intelligence for military operations and as court evidence.

Historian Robert Edgerton stated:

If a question was not answered to the interrogator's satisfaction, the subject was beaten and kicked. If that did not lead to the desired confession, and it rarely did, more force was applied. Electric shock was widely used, and so was fire. Women were choked and held under water; gun barrels, beer bottles, and even knives were thrust into their vaginas. Men had beer bottles thrust up their rectums, were dragged behind Land Rovers, whipped, burned and bayoneted... Some police officers did not bother with more time-consuming forms of torture; they simply shot any suspect who refused to answer, then told the next suspect, to dig his own grave. When the grave was finished, the man was asked if he would now be willing to talk."

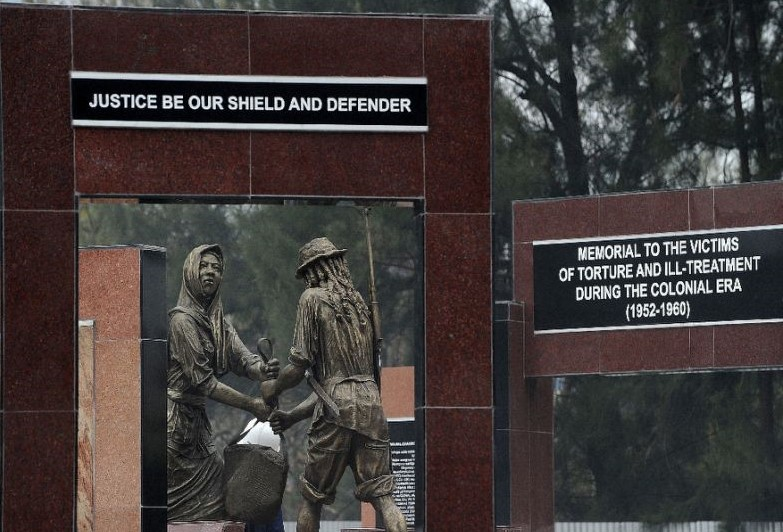
Memorial in honour of victims of torture and ill-treatment during the colonial era, Nairobi

More than a million Kikuyu were held in "enclosed villages" as part of the villagisation program; although some were Mau Mau guerrillas, most were victims of collective punishment that colonial authorities imposed on large areas of the country. Thousands were beaten or sexually assaulted to extract information about the Mau Mau threat. Later, prisoners suffered even worse mistreatment in an attempt to force them to renounce their allegiance to the insurgency and to obey commands. Prisoners were questioned with the help of "slicing off ears, boring holes in eardrums, flogging until death, pouring paraffin over suspects who were then set alight, and burning eardrums with lit cigarettes". The use of castration and denying access to medical aid to the detainees by the British were also widespread and common. Among the detainees who suffered severe mistreatment was Hussein Onyango Obama, the grandfather of former U.S. President Barack Obama. According to his widow, British soldiers forced pins into his fingernails and buttocks and squeezed his testicles between metal rods and two others were castrated.

In June 1957, Eric Griffith-Jones, the attorney general of the British administration in Kenya, wrote to the governor, Sir Evelyn Baring, detailing the way the regime of abuse at the colony's detention camps was being subtly altered. He said that the mistreatment of the detainees is "distressingly reminiscent of conditions in Nazi Germany or Communist Russia". Despite this, he said that in order for abuse to remain legal, Mau Mau suspects must be beaten mainly on their upper body, "vulnerable parts of the body should not be struck, particularly the spleen, liver or kidneys", and it was important that "those who administer violence ... should remain collected, balanced and dispassionate". He also reminded the governor that "If we are going to sin," he wrote, "we must sin quietly."

=== Chuka massacre ===
The Chuka massacre, which happened in Chuka, Kenya, was perpetrated by members of the King's African Rifles B Company in June 1953 with 20 unarmed people killed during the Mau Mau uprising. Members of the 5th KAR B Company entered the Chuka area on 13 June 1953, to flush out rebels suspected of hiding in the nearby forests. Over the next few days, the regiment had captured and executed 20 people suspected of being Mau Mau fighters for unknown reasons.

All of the soldiers involved in the Chuka patrols were placed under open arrest at Nairobi's Buller Camp, but General George Erskine, Commander-in-Chief of the East Africa Command, decided not to prosecute them. Instead, he would make an example of their commanding officer, Major Gerald Selby Lee Griffiths. And, rather than risk bringing publicity to the Chuka affair, Erskine was able to obtain evidence to have Griffiths charged with the murder of two other suspects in a separate incident that had taken place a few weeks before the Chuka massacre. However, the 5th KAR soldiers giving evidence at the courts martial in November 1953 refused to speak frankly against Griffiths. He was acquitted of the charge and rest of the soldiers were not charged either. Following public outcry, however, Griffiths was then tried under six separate charges of torture and disgraceful conduct for torturing two unarmed detainees, including a man named Njeru Ndwega. At his court-martial, it was stated that Griffiths had made Ndwega take off his pants, before telling a teenage African private to castrate him. When the private, a 16-year-old Somali named Ali Segat, refused to do this, Griffiths instead ordered him to cut off Ndwega's ear, to which Segat complied. On 11 March 1954, Griffiths was found guilty on five counts. He was sentenced to five years in prison and was cashiered from the Army. He served his sentence at Wormwood Scrubs Prison in London. None of the other ranks involved in the massacre has been prosecuted.

Griffiths was put before a second court-martial following the McLean inquiry's findings charged with the murder of the first guide. On 11 March 1954, he was found guilty of murder and sentenced to five years imprisonment; he was cashiered from the Army and served his sentence in Wormwood Scrubs in London.

=== Hola massacre ===
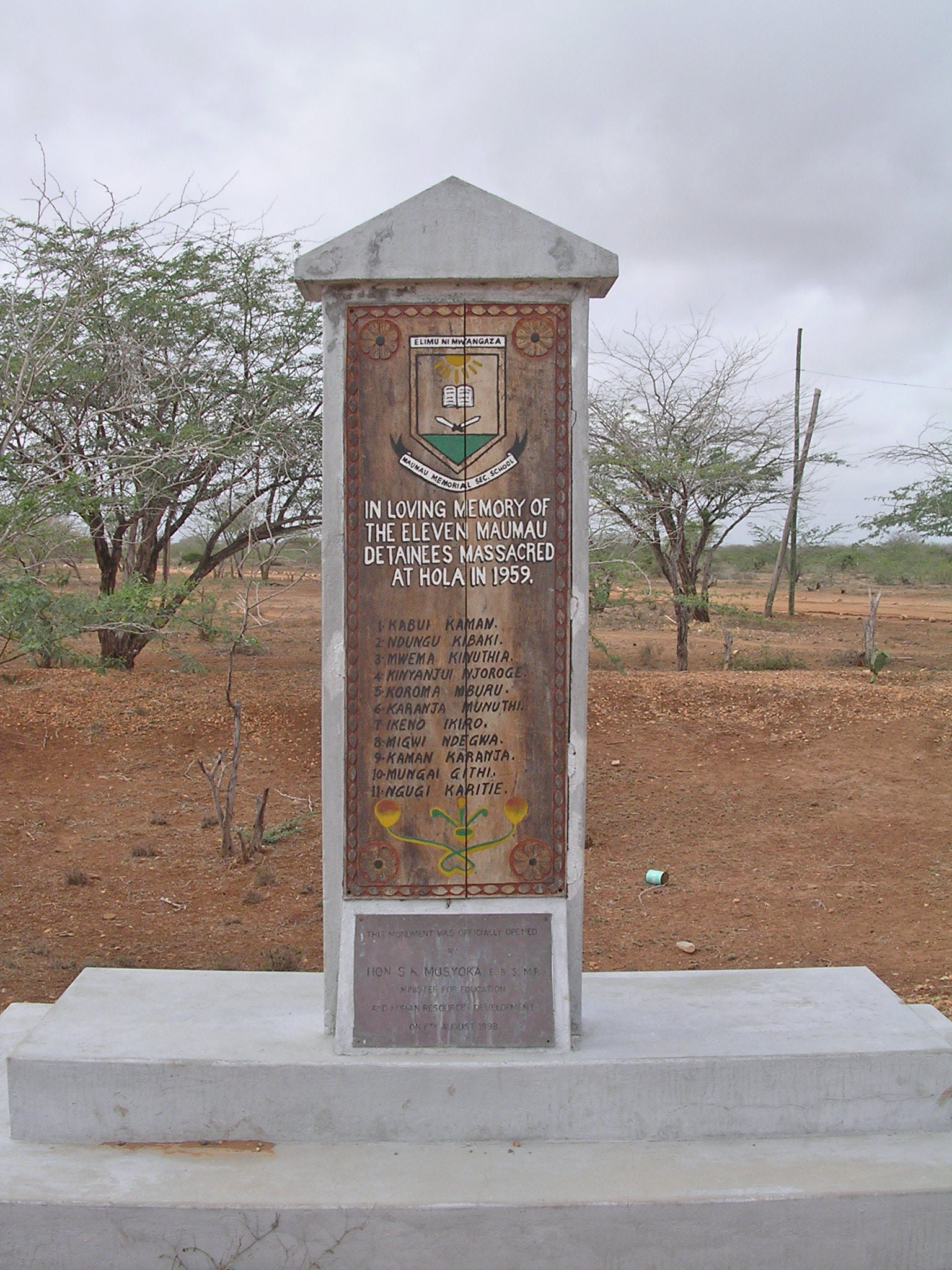
Hola Massacre monument

The Hola massacre was an incident at a detention camp in Hola, Kenya. By January 1959 the camp had a population of 506 detainees of whom 127 were held in a secluded "closed camp". This more remote camp near Garissa, eastern Kenya, was reserved for the most uncooperative of the detainees. They often refused, even when threats of force were made, to join in the colonial "rehabilitation process" or perform manual labour or obey colonial orders. The camp commandant outlined a plan that would force 88 of the detainees to bend to work. On 3 March 1959, the camp commandant put this plan into action – as a result, 11 detainees were clubbed to death by guards. All of the surviving detainees sustained serious permanent injuries. The British government accepts that the colonial administration tortured detainees, but denies liability.

=== Kiruara massacre ===
The Kiruara Massacre occurred on the 23 November 1952. British security forces were called to a crowd of Kikuyu who had gathered to hear the prophecies of a man who claimed to have seen a vision foreshadowing the end of colonial rule. After the crowd failed to disperse, the authorities opened fire with Sten guns. While the official death toll for the massacre stood at fifteen, it has been claimed that the death toll may have been as high as four hundred.

== The Troubles ==
The Troubles in Northern Ireland was a three-decade-long ethnic-nationalist conflict between Ulster loyalists (primarily the Ulster Volunteer Force and Ulster Defence Association) and Irish nationalists (primarily the Provisional Irish Republican Army) in the region. Due to the escalating tension, the British Army was deployed into the region in 1969 to serve as a peacekeeping force under the task force Operation Banner. The soldiers were initially welcomed by the Irish Catholic population; the relieve of the RUC from some security duties and the disbandment of the B specials brought hope that discrimination and heavy-handedness would be rooted out. The confidence in the British army, however, had vanished by April 1970, when British forces used gas canisters to quell a Catholic demonstration at Ballymurphy and later in July imposed a curfew to search for weapons in the Catholic district of Lower Falls.

During the Troubles, British Army personnel have been accused of war crimes, mainly in nationalist areas. The deadliest incident happened in January 1972 on Bloody Sunday, when British paratroopers killed 14 civilians and injured several more at a protest held by the Northern Ireland Civil Rights Association (NICRA). Another major incident took place at Ballymurphy, Belfast, where eleven Irish Catholics were killed by British Army snipers in August 1971. In the course of the already mentioned Falls Curfew, in July 1970, four civilians were shot dead and at least 60 wounded. Later in the conflict, there were other attacks against civilians involving the British Army, like the riots in Coalisland in 1992 or the killings of Thomas Mills in County Antrim in 1972, Michael Naan and Andrew Murray in County Fermanagh in 1972, John Pat Cunningham in County Tyrone in 1974, Majella O'Hare in County Armagh in 1976, Aidan McAnespie in County Tyrone in 1988 and Peter McBride in Belfast in 1992.

=== Collusion between British security forces and loyalist paramilitaries ===
British security forces also colluded with loyalist paramilitaries throughout the conflict either as informants or by participating in criminal activities with them. One example was the Glenanne gang—a secret alliance of loyalist militants, British soldiers from the Ulster Defence Regiment (UDR), and Royal Ulster Constabulary (RUC) officers—that carried out a string of attacks against Irish Catholics and nationalists in an area of Northern Ireland known as the "murder triangle" and also carried out some attacks in the Republic of Ireland. Evidence suggests that the group was responsible for the deaths of about 120 civilians. The Cassel Report investigated 76 killings attributed to the group and found evidence that UDR soldiers and RUC policemen were involved in 74 of those. One former member, RUC officer John Weir, said his superiors knew of the group's activities but allowed it to continue. Attacks attributed to the group include the Dublin and Monaghan bombings (which killed 34 civilians, the deadliest attack in The Troubles), the Miami Showband killings, the Reavey and O'Dowd killings and the Hillcrest Bar bombing.

The Stevens Inquiries concluded that the Force Research Unit (FRU), a covert unit of the British Army's Intelligence Corps, helped loyalists kill civilians. FRU commanders say their plan was to make loyalist groups "more professional" by helping them target nationalists and prevent them killing civilians. The Stevens Inquiries found evidence only two lives were saved and that FRU was involved with at least 30 loyalist killings and many other attacks – many of the victims uninvolved civilians. One of the most prominent killings was that of the Republican solicitor Pat Finucane. FRU agent Brian Nelson also helped ship weapons to loyalists from South Africa; the weapons were later used in loyalist atrocities, including the Milltown Cemetery attack and Avenue Bar shooting. From 1992 to 1994, loyalists were responsible for more deaths than republicans, partly due to FRU. Stevens would later claim that members of the security forces attempted to obstruct his team's investigation.

=== Mistreatment of detainees and prisoners ===
In Operation Demetrius, the British government initiated a mass arrest and internment (imprisonment without trial) of people suspected of being involved with Irish nationalist militants; due to faulty and out-of-date intelligence, many were no longer involved in or never had links with nationalist militancy. The introduction of internment, the way the arrests were carried out, and the abuse of those arrested, led to mass protests and a sharp increase in violence. Amid the violence, about 7,000 people fled or were forced out of their homes. In 2017, barrister Hugh Southey, representing 14 men who endured the "five techniques" interrogation method while interned in 1971, told the High Court that the mistreatment "was in the scale of a war crime".

In March 1976, the British government announced that the Special Category Status, which granted paramilitary prisoners de facto prisoner of war (POW) status in accordance with the principles of the Geneva Conventions, would not be given to those convicted after this date.

During the 1980–1981 no wash protest at the all-women Armagh Prison, protesting prisoners in February 1980 were subsequently beaten by guards in riot gear and confined to their cells for 24 hours, during which time they were denied access to the bathroom and given little food to eat. Over the course of their confinement, their chamber pots began to fill, forcing the women to dump the urine out of spy holes in their doors (these were subsequently nailed shut) and to throw the excrement out their windows (which were then boarded up). As time went on, the dirty protest changed the conditions within the prison from bad to worse, adding filth and stench to the already nearly insurmountable obstacles to daily life within the walls of Armagh.

In the 1983 Maze Prison escape, 38 IRA prisoners escaped from the maximum security prison HM Prison Maze in County Antrim in Northern Ireland. Of the 38 who escaped, 19 were recaptured and returned to prison. It was there that severe mistreatment occurred upon the returning prisoners. During the extradition hearing of fugitive and Maze Prison escapee James J. Smyth at the U.S. district court in San Francisco, Maze prison governor John Baxter admitted that guards brutalised the returning inmates following the 1983 breakout and later lied in court by denying the prisoners had suffered dog bites. However, he said the officers involved had never been disciplined and there were no plans to do so. U.S. district judge Barbara A. Caulfield wrote under the "Maze prison" section of her finding that:

6. The republican prisoners who escaped but were captured and returned were forced to run a gauntlet of guard dogs which were allowed to bite them. The guards ordered attack dogs upon the republican prisoners as they were moved to other cell blocks. The dogs bit several prisoners. The prisoners were denied medical care for several days. Many of the escapees were rounded up and returned to the Maze immediately after the escape. Upon their return to the Maze, prison officers kicked and punched the returned escapees and repeatedly called them "Fenian bastards." Numerous prison officers took part in the mistreatment of the returned escapees.

7. There was no evidence that prisoners in the loyalist wing were similarly treated. That is, of the loyalist and republican prisoners who did not escape, only the republicans were moved, beaten, kicked, bitten by dogs, and subjected to religious and political insults.

8. Several prisoners brought actions for damages for their treatment following the escape. The court in Northern Ireland found that there was a widespread conspiracy to conceal the fact of the assault of the prisoners.

9. No disciplinary action was ever taken against the prison officers for their abuse of the prisoners in connection with the escape or for perjuring themselves. The current prison governor testified that there are no plans to discipline the prison officers involved and the "case is closed" as far as he is concerned. None of the testifying prison officials knew whether any of the prison officers who participated in the abuse of the returned escapees or who perjured themselves are still employed at the Maze prison. The Maze Prison governor, John Baxter, acknowledged that many of the guards who are at the Maze now have been there since the 1983 escape.

...

12. Ex-prisoners from the Maze are subject to increased scrutiny by the security forces. Several witnesses on behalf of James Smyth testified that ex-prisoners are frequently subject to harassment by the security forces.

13. Sean Mackin was arrested and charged with the attempted murder of a prison officer's daughter. Mackin testified that while he was in the Crumlin Road prison before trial, he was treated differently from other prisoners in that every time an officer was killed, he would either be beaten in his cell or put in solitary confinement.

...

15. Paul Kane was a 1983 Maze escapee who was extradited from the Republic of Ireland to Northern Ireland in 1989. During the course of his extradition proceedings, he applied to the Minister of Justice in Ireland not to send him back because he feared being assaulted by the prison staff and members of the security forces. The Minister of Justice denied the application and guaranteed that Kane would not be abused upon his return. As soon as Kane was handed over to the security forces at the Northern Ireland border, verbal abuse, including anti-Catholic remarks, began. Once put in a holding cell in Belfast, handcuffs were placed very tightly on his wrists and despite numerous requests, the handcuffs were not removed or loosened. Kane also was roughed up by the security forces within hours of being returned to Northern Ireland.

== War on Terror ==
The Human Rights Watch reported that the UK government sought the overseas operations bill to stop the prosecution of British soldiers for torture and other war crimes committed overseas. Under this bill the power of the attorney general, a member of the government, had more power to protect soldiers from prosecution whether with a genuine case or not.

In November 2019, BBC News reported that the British government and military were accused of covering up the killing and torture of civilians and children during the wars in Afghanistan and Iraq. Leaked documents allegedly contain evidence implicating British troops in killing children and the torture of civilians in these regions. The Iraq Historic Allegations Team (IHAT), which investigated British war crimes in Iraq, and Operation Northmoor, which investigated the same in Afghanistan, were dismantled by the British government in 2017 after Phil Shiner, a solicitor who took more than 1,000 cases to IHAT, was struck off from practising law amid allegations he had paid people in Iraq to find clients.

Some former IHAT and Operation Northmoor investigators said Shiner's actions were used as an excuse to close down the inquiries. No case investigated by IHAT or Operation Northmoor led to a prosecution. An IHAT detective told Panorama: "The Ministry of Defence had no intention of prosecuting any soldier of whatever rank he was unless it was absolutely necessary, and they couldn’t wriggle their way out of it". Investigators said they found evidence of murders by an SAS soldier, as well as deaths in custody, beatings, torture and sexual abuse of detainees. A senior SAS commander was found to have covered up the crimes committed by soldiers under his command.

Corporal Donald Payne, a former soldier of the Queen's Lancashire Regiment of the British Army, became the first member of the British armed forces to be convicted of a war crime under the provisions of the International Criminal Court Act 2001. He was jailed for one year and dismissed from the army. In June 2020, Johnny Mercer said that Operation Northmoor had been completed and no more British troops would be prosecuted over alleged war crimes in Afghanistan and Iraq.

=== Iraq War ===
During the Iraq War, the illegal use of the five techniques by British service members contributed to the death of Baha Mousa. On 19 September 2006, Corporal Donald Payne pleaded guilty to a charge of inhumane treatment to persons, making him the first member of the British armed forces to plead guilty to a war crime. He was subsequently jailed for one year and expelled from the army. Six other soldiers were cleared of any charges. Mr Justice McKinnon suggested that he believed there had been some level of covering-up with relation to the case. In 2021, the Supreme Court of the United Kingdom found that the use of the five techniques amounts to torture.

==== Torture and inhuman treatment of detainees ====
During the Iraq War, British forces were implicated in widespread instances of torture and inhuman treatment of Iraqi detainees held in UK-controlled facilities, particularly in southern Iraq. The Aitken Report further determined that interrogation techniques banned by British law, including the “five techniques”, had been systematically reintroduced despite their prohibition. Human rights organisations and investigative reporting have argued that the abusive treatment documented was not isolated, noting that similar techniques and mistreatment of detainees were systemic, and occurred at multiple UK-run detention facilities in the Basra region between 2003 and 2006, and that such practices were part of wider patterns of abuse rather than singular events. Official investigations also reviewed video evidence showing British soldiers physically abusing Iraqi detainees and civilians, including juveniles, during security operations in southern Iraq in 2003, highlighting concerns raised by investigators regarding abuse practices involving minors.

==== Sexual violence and sexual humiliation ====
Allegations of sexual violence, sexual assault and sexual humiliation were documented alongside other forms of detainee abuse by British forces in Iraq, including forced nudity, simulated sexual acts and other sexually degrading treatment during detention and interrogation. The International Criminal Court (ICC) Office of the Prosecutor, in its final report on the Iraq/UK preliminary examination, cited allegations arising from Camp Breadbasket in 2003, where photographic evidence showed British soldiers forcing hooded Iraqi detainees into stress positions and simulating sexual acts. Submissions reviewed by the ICC described sexual abuse as part of a broader pattern of detainee mistreatment, rather than exceptional misconduct by individual soldiers. The combination of sexual humiliation with physical abuse was common during Iraqi detainees interrogation practices. The European Center for Constitutional and Human Rights (ECCHR) states that hundreds of Iraqis detained by UK forces have described abuses with sexualised components.

==== Unlawful killings of civilians ====
British forces were also implicated in multiple unlawful killings of Iraqi civilians during the conflict, including deaths occurring during arrests, raids and in custody; Official investigations also documented civilian deaths at military checkpoints operated by British forces, including incidents in which children were killed Among the best-known cases was the killing of Nadhem Abdullah, who died in 2003 after being beaten by British soldiers during an arrest in Basra; although several soldiers were charged, they were later acquitted at court-martial. Another widely reported case was the death of Ahmad Jabbar Kareem Ali, a 15-year-old Iraqi boy who drowned after being forced into the Shatt al-Basra canal by British soldiers in 2003.

==== International legal assessment ====
Between 2014 and 2020, the ICC conducted a preliminary examination into alleged war crimes committed by the British army in Iraq between 2003 and 2009. The Office of the Prosecutor concluded that there was a reasonable basis to believe that members of the British armed forces committed war crimes, including wilful killing, torture, cruel or inhuman treatment, outrages upon personal dignity and rape or other forms of sexual violence. The ICC ultimately declined to open a full investigation, citing the existence of domestic proceedings in the UK, but noted concerns regarding their effectiveness and independence. Human rights organisations criticised the ICC Prosecutor’s decision not to open a full investigation, arguing that it undermined accountability and effectively rewarded years of obstruction and delay in domestic investigations by the British government.

=== Afghanistan War ===
In September 2013, Royal Marines Sergeant Alexander Blackman, formerly of Taunton, Somerset, was convicted at court martial of having murdered an unarmed, wounded Taliban insurgent during the Helmand province campaign. On 6 December 2013, Sgt. Blackman received a sentence of life imprisonment with a minimum of ten years before being eligible for parole. He was also dismissed with disgrace from the Royal Marines.

In April 2017, following an appeal that saw his conviction reduced to manslaughter, Blackman was released from prison having served three years of his sentence.

In July 2022, a BBC investigation said that unarmed men were repeatedly killed by SAS operatives in suspicious circumstances, focusing in particular on a series of night raids conducted by one squadron over the course of its six-month tour in Helmand Province in 2010/11 which may have led to the unlawful killings 54 people. The investigators also said that personnel at the highest echelon of the UK's special forces including its former director Mark Carleton-Smith were aware of the allegations, but did not report them to the military police when they conducted two investigations involving alleged offences committed by the squadron, despite a legal obligation to do so.

On 22 March 2023, an inquiry was opened into unlawful killings in Afghanistan.

== See also ==
- Arab Investigation Centres
- Black and Tans
- Bloody Sunday (1920)
- Bombing of Hamburg
- British genocide
- Burning of Cork
- Human rights in the United Kingdom
- Jallianwala Bagh massacre
- Massacre of Chumik Shenko
- Military history of the United Kingdom
- Parliamentary motion to impeach Tony Blair
- Second Boer War concentration camps

== Sources ==
- Bridgland, Tony (1999). "The Baralong: Germany is Outraged". Sea Killers in Disguise: Q Ships and Decoy Raiders. Leo Cooper. ISBN 978-0-85052-675-2.
- de Zayas, Alfred (1989), The Wehrmacht War Crimes Bureau, 1939–1945 (with Walter Rabus). Lincoln: University of Nebraska Press, 1989; ISBN 0-8032-9908-7. New revised edition with Picton Press, Rockland, Maine; ISBN 0-89725-421-X. German edition: Die Wehrmacht Untersuchungsstelle, 7th revised and enlarged edition Universitas/Langen Müller, Munich 2001; 8th revised and enlarged edition Lindenbaum Verlag, 2012; ISBN 978-3-938176-39-9.
- Emsley, Clive (2013). Soldier, Sailor, Beggarman, Thief: Crime and the British Armed Services since 1914. Oxford University Press, USA. ISBN 978-019965-371-3.
- Hesperides (2007). The Annual Register Review of Public Events at Home and Abroad for the Year 1916. Read Books. ISBN 978-1-4067-5198-7.
- Longden, Sean (2004). To the Victor the Spoils: D-Day to VE Day, the Reality Behind the Heroism. Arris. ISBN 978-184437-038-2.
- Messimer, Dwight R. (2002). Verschollen: World War I U-boat Losses. Naval Institute Press. ISBN 1-55750-475-X.
- Shermer, Michael; Grobman, Alex (2009). Denying History: Who Says the Holocaust Never Happened and Why Do They Say It? (2nd, illustrated ed.). University of California Press. p. 261. ISBN 978-0-520-26098-6.
- Solis, Gary D. (2010). The Law of Armed Conflict: International Humanitarian Law in War. Cambridge University Press; 1 edition. ISBN 978-052187-088-7.
