= List of hospital ships sunk in World War II =

Hospital ships should display large Red Crosses or Red Crescents. The HS Awa Maru was displaying illuminated white crosses on its side when sunk.

== List ==
Name	Image	Nationality	Date	Location of wreck	Cause	Lives lost	Note
HS Andros		Greece	23 April 1941	At Loutraki (West of the Corinth Canal)	Sunk by Italian aircraft	?	
HS Armenia	HS Armenia	Soviet Union	7 November 1941	On voyage from Yalta to Gurzuf 44°15′00″N 34°17′00″E	Attacked by German torpedo-carrying He 111H Bombers,	Over 5,000	
HS Arno	HS Arno	Italy	10 September 1942	About 40 miles NE of Ras el Tin 33°14′00″N 23°23′00″E	Sunk by aerial torpedoes from the RAF	27	
HS Asahi Maru	Asahi Maru	Japan	17 August 1945	Inland Sea. W of Ushijima, 1.25 miles off Bizan Seto	Collides with oiler Manju Maru, beached. Abandoned as a constructive total loss.	–	
HS Attiki		Greece	11 April 1941	Doro Channel off Karystos	Bombed and sunk by German Stuka dive-bombers at 11:30 pm even though the large red crosses were well placed and illuminated. One of the Stukas machine-gunned the survivors struggling in the water.	28	
HS Awa Maru		Japan	1 April 1945	Inland Sea. W of Ushijima, 1.25 miles off Bizan Seto	Sunk by the U.S. Navy submarine USS Queenfish	2003	
HS Berlin	HS Berlin	Germany	31 January 1945	8 miles (13 km) from the port at Novorossiysk and 2 miles (3.2 km) from shore, at 44°36′15″N 37°52′35″E	Note that during World War II Berlin was mined and in the Baltic and beached in shallow waters at position 54°02.6 N/14°19 E, in shallow waters. After the war Berlin was salvaged, handed over to the Soviet Union as a prize and renamed Admiral Nakhimov. She was in service as a passenger liner in the Black Sea on 31 August 1986, when she collided with the freighter M/S Pjotr Wassjew and sank.	1	423 people died when the ship sank as Admiral Nakhimov in 1986.
HS Buenos Aires Maru		Japan	27 November 1943	Off Saint Matthias Island in Steffen Strait 02°40′00″S 149°20′00″E	Bombed by American warplanes	158	
HS California		Italy	11 August 1941	Syracuse Harbour	Torpedoed and sunk by British aerial torpedoes	10	
AHS Centaur	AHS Centaur	Australia	14 May 1943	Off North Stradbroke Island, Queensland	Torpedoed by the Japanese submarine I-177	268	
HS Città di Trapani		Italy	1 December 1942	11 miles east of Isola dei Cani (off Bizerta)	She struck a sea mine.	5	
HS Dronning Maud	HS Dronning Maud	Norway	01 May 1940	Near Gratangen, Norway	Sunk by German warplanes	42	
HS Esperos		Greece	21 April 1941	Off Missolonghi, Greece	Sunk by German warplanes	?	
SS Giulio Cesare		Italy	28 August 1944	Off Trieste, Italy	Sunk by South African warplanes	?	
SS Op Ten Noort renamed: HMHS Hikawa Maru No.2	SS Op ten Noort	Netherlands Japan	17 August 1945	Wakasa Bay	Scuttled by placing explosive charges in the hull, to cover war crimes (14 August 1945)	0	
HMHS Maid of Kent	HMHS Maid of Kent	Great Britain	21 May 1940	Dieppe harbour	Bombed by German warplanes	43	
HMHS Newfoundland	HMHS Newfoundland	UK	13 September 1943	40 nautical miles (74 km) off of Salerno, Italy, 40°13′00″N 14°21′00″E	Bombed by German warplanes. After burning for two days, she was sunk by gunfire from the destroyers USS Mayo and USS Plunkett.	21	
HMHS Paris		British Empire	02 June 1940	Off Dunkirk	Bombed by German warplanes	?	
HS Po		Italy	14 March 1941	Inside the Bay of Valona, Albania, 2.0 kilometers off Cape Dukati and Crionerò 40°22′00″N 19°28′00″E	Sunk by a British torpedo bomber	24	
HS RAMB IV	Ramb IV	Italy United Kingdom	10 May 1942	Off Alexandria, Egypt	Bombed and set afire by German warplanes and sunk	165	
MV Robert Ley	MV Robert Ley	Germany	09 March 1945	Hamburg	Bombed and sunk by British warplanes	?	
HS Sicilia		Italy	04 April 1943	Naples Harbor	Bombed and sunk by American warplanes	?	
HS Sokratis		Greece	22 April 1941	Antikyra, Greece	Sunk by German warplanes	?	
HMHS St David		British Empire	24 January 1944	40 kilometers south of Anzio	Sunk by German warplanes (Hs-293)	96	
HS Tevere		Italy	17 February 1941	Off Tripoli	She struck a sea mine	4	
HS Tübingen		Germany	18 November 1944	3.5 miles south of Cap. Premantura Pula (Pola)	Attacked by two British warplanes (Beaufighters)	6	
HMHS Talamba	Talamba	British Empire	10 July 1943	Off Syracuse, Italy during the amphibious landings on Sicily	Bombed and sunk by an Italian aircraft while embarking wounded	5	

== See also ==
- List of hospital ships sunk in World War I
