= Murder of Peter McBride =

1992 killing in Belfast

Peter McBride
- Born: Peter McBride Jr. 20/26 February 1974; Belfast, County Antrim, Northern Ireland
- Died: 4 September 1992 (aged 18); Belfast, County Antrim, Northern Ireland
- Cause of death: Gunshot wounds
- Known for: Killing by the British Army
- Children: 2

Peter McBride Jr. (20/26 February 1974 – 4 September 1992) was a Catholic teenager who was shot and killed by soldiers of the Scots Guards, as he allegedly ran away from their patrol after getting searched in the New Lodge area of Belfast in September 1992. Two soldiers Mark Wright and James Fisher were charged and convicted for murder in February 1995.

== Personal life ==
Peter McBride Jr. was born between 20 and 26 February 1974 to Jean and Peter McBride Sr. in Belfast, he had three sisters Kelly, Roisin and Martha.

McBride would have two daughters one in early to mid 1991 and the other in July or August 1992.

== Killing ==
On 4 September 1992 Peter McBride who was walking home on Nearby Spamount Street, he was stopped by soldiers of the 1st Battalion Scots Guards who questioned and searched him, they then searched a plastic white bag he was holding and was let go, however two of the soldiers Mark Douglas Wright (16) and James Fisher (21) pursued him. While on Upper Meadow Street McBride began to try and run away, and they would then open fire on McBride, hitting him once in the back causing him to collapse on a car and then slide on to the ground. Wright and Fisher then shot McBride again as he laid on the ground wounded killing him instantly.

Wright and Fisher claimed they found a coffee jar bomb when searching McBride, which prompted them to open fire on McBride.

== Trial ==
In February 1995 Mark D. Wright and James Fisher were both charged with murder. It was found that the two guardsmen lied about having found a petrol bomb, and that he was in-fact unarmed at the time. This also cast doubt that he was running away, and some claimed he was shot as he was walking away after the search. The two guardsmen were convicted of murder on 10 February 1995, and were sentenced to life imprisonment. They were imprisoned at HM Prison Maghaberry.

Wright and Fisher would attempt to appeal their sentence in December 1995 and in March 1996, both appeals were rejected.

In July 1998 the then secretary of Northern Ireland, Mo Mowlam announced that another investigation into the soldiers would take place. Two months later on 1 September 1998 both Wright and Fisher were released from prison.

== Legacy ==
On 21 November 2000 in a controversial decision it was announced that both Wright and Fisher were to be re-admitted to the army, after they did a reconsideration of the case.

McBride's family and several councilors criticized the decision by pointing out that a soldier Charles Ingram who cheated on the game show Who Wants to be a Millionaire? was fired from the army while two soldiers who murdered a young father of two were re-admitted to the army. One east Belfast Alliance councilor Naomi Long said "To treat Peter McBride's killers more leniently than a quiz cheat is a sick joke," Long would then add, "It would appear that the army is more worried about bad publicity in England than justice in Northern Ireland."

Shortly after the decision the then president of Sinn Féin, Gerry Adams also criticized the decision and would call for the removal of Wright and Fisher.

On 14 May 2003 the Independent Assessor of Military Complaints Procedures, Jim McDonald would urge the army to reconsider their decision saying "I would urge the Army Board to initiate a final appeal panel, drawn from people outside the military system, able to exercise publicly that crucial ingredient of independence and transparency which is now a requirement of good governance," McDonald would also say "When the Army are dismissing young men for smoking pot, the fact that it has failed to do anything with these two guys undermines its credibility," he then added "They should not have been reinstated."

On 13 June 2003 the Court of Appeal in Belfast said that the Wright and Fisher shouldn't have been re-admitted, but would stop short of ordering the army to dismiss them.

In mid September 2003 McBride's sister Kelly McBride ran for seat of Brent East in the parliament to spread awareness of McBride's killing, she was endorsed by many Irish republicans most notably Gerry Adams. She would later admit that she didn't actually want to win. McBride got a total of 189 votes.

On 7 June 2021 Peter's mother, Jean McBride, died at the age of 65.
