= British genocide =

Several events that occurred under the British Empire have been described as acts of genocide, with varying degrees of acceptance among historians:

- Events during the British colonization of Australia and New Zealand, especially:
  - Genocide of Indigenous Australians
  - the Black War in Tasmania
  - the massacres of the Australian frontier wars
- The Great Famine in Ireland (1845–1852); see Great Famine (Ireland) § Genocide question
- The aftermath of the Siege of Delhi in 1857
- Bengal famine of 1943
- British actions during the Mau Mau rebellion in Kenya (1952–1960)
