= HS Tübingen =

German World War II hospital ship

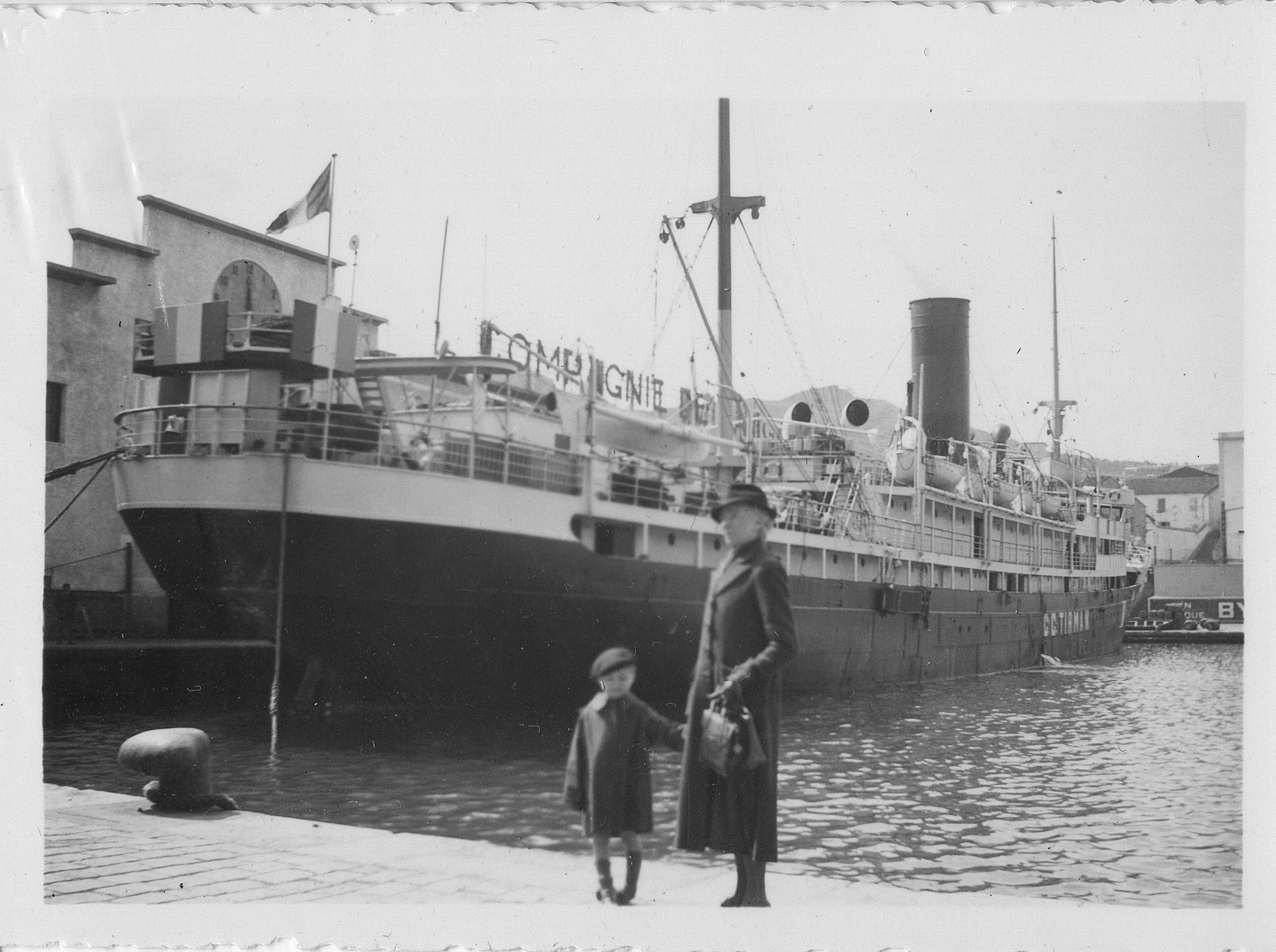
Gouverneur Général Tirman in a French port in 1941

HS Tübingen was a German hospital ship of the Second World War. Built in France in 1922, she served as the passenger liner Gouverneur Général Tirman until the fall of France in 1940. In 1943, she was designated a hospital ship by the German authorities and renamed Tübingen. She served on routes between Italy and Greece, transferring sick and wounded troops, though occasionally she was found by British forces to be operating in contravention of the Geneva Conventions by carrying fit personnel. Tübingen was sunk on 18 November 1944 off Croatia by British Beaufighter aircraft after failures to properly identify the vessel and her location. A formal protest over the sinking was raised to the protecting power by the German authorities.

== Civilian career ==
The ship was launched at La Seyne-sur-Mer in Southern France on 25 February 1922 as the liner Gouverneur Général Tirman. She was named for Louis Tirman, governor-general of French Algeria from 1881 to 1891. Gouverneur Général Tirman sailed for the Compagnie de navigation mixte until October 1935, when she was acquired by the Société générale des transports maritimes as a replacement for the steamship Gouverneur Général Laferrière which had been taken into French government service.

== German hospital ship ==
A page from the translated war diary of the German Naval Staff Operations Division recording the thanks of Army Group E for the service of Tübingen and Gradisca in evacuating 3,500 wounded troops from the Aegean coast in October 1944

After the 1940 fall of France in the Second World War, Gouverneur Général Tirman came under German control. In 1943, she was designated by the German authorities as a hospital ship; in this role, her gross register tonnage was 3,509 and she was renamed to Tübingen.

Tübingen operated in the Adriatic and Ionian Seas, transferring sick and wounded Axis military personnel between Piraeus, Greece and Trieste, Italy. In this role she was subject to periodic boarding by the Royal Navy to check for violations of her protective status as a hospital ship under the Geneva Conventions, such as by carrying unwounded troops. She was occasionally found to be in contravention. On one trip departing from Salonica, she and fellow hospital ship Gradisca were diverted by the Royal Navy to a British port and those on board taken prisoner of war. A high percentage of those carried were found to be only slightly wounded and expected to be likely to return to combat within 12 months. This action was considered to be justified under the Geneva Conventions, and no protest was made by the German authorities. Some 4,000 were made prisoner from the ships. In July 1944, Tübingen was intercepted by the destroyers Tenacious and Tuscan as she was suspected of illegally transporting troops and ammunition. Tübingen attempted to hide among the coast's channels and islands before putting into harbour at Šibenik, Croatia. She was halted by British warning shots while trying to escape to Dubrovnik under a smoke screen and covering fire from coastal batteries. An inspection found her to be operating legally, and she was released to continue on her journey.

=== Sinking ===
Tübingen was sunk by British forces on the morning of on 18 November 1944 off Pula, Croatia. She had been spotted by a flight of four British Beaufighter aircraft. The commander of the flight was unable to communicate back to his base because of radio difficulties and asked his second-in-command to do so. The commander had not been able to identify Tübingen as a hospital ship and asked his subordinate to request directions from base. The second-in-command had spotted the hospital ship markings and assumed that his commander had too and that he must be aware of particular circumstances that would justify the sinking of the vessel. The message to base was transmitted as "1 HS 350" (one hospital ship, course 350 degrees) was misheard as "1 HSL 350" (one high speed launch, course 350 degrees) and the position as being in the Gulf of Venice, many miles away. The controlling officer at base determined there were no Allied high speed launches in the reported area and gave permission to attack.

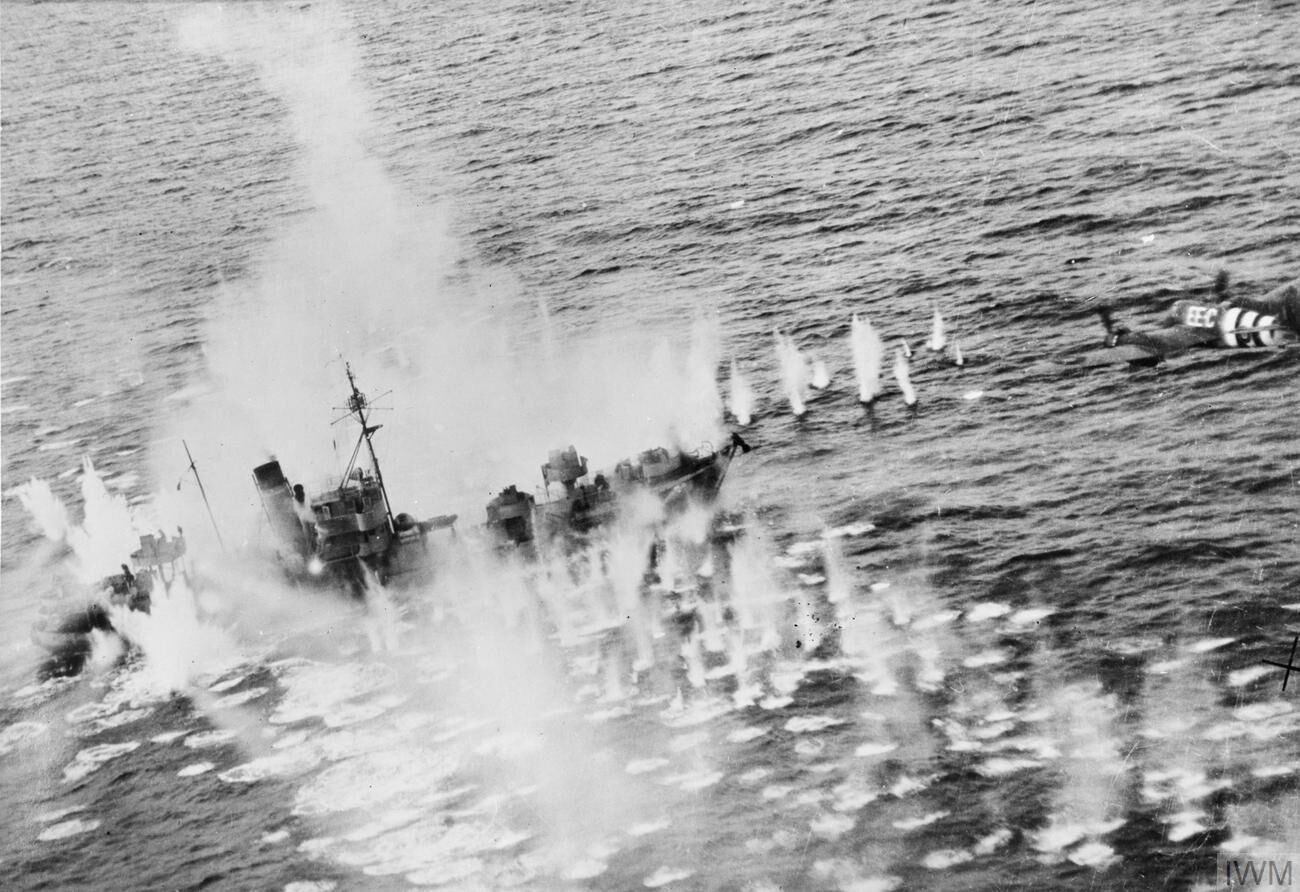
Bristol Beaufighters (one visible at right) attacking a German Vorpostenboot in the Skagerrak on 15 October 1944.

Two of the Beaufighters attacked Tübingen, which reported being strafed six times from her starboard side and three times from port. The attack lasted from 7:45 Central European Time until 8:05 and she sank at 8:20, after launching her lifeboats. Three German E-boats were sent from Pula to search for survivors and rescued 115 of the 120 who had been on board. The captain of Tübingen at the time of her sinking was Wolfgang Diettrich Hermichen.

The sinking of Tübingen was acknowledged as an error by the British, who reported that there were no wounded aboard at the time and that casualties among the crew were light. A surprised Foreign Office reported the sinking to the Swiss government, who were acting as the protecting power, on the afternoon of the sinking. Germany registered a formal protest with Switzerland over the sinking on 24 November.

The British Air Ministry carried out an investigation into the sinking, which found that it had resulted from "a curious mixture of bad luck and stupidity". The British forces headquarters in the Mediterranean had been made aware of the proposed course of Tübingen but the position of the vessel as received by the controlling officer had been incorrect. The British reported that Tübingen had not been properly illuminated at the time of the sinking to make her protected status clear and requested that Germany ensure this was remedied in the future. The German government responded that visibility was good at the time of the sinking and that illumination had been turned off shortly after 7:00, the sun having risen at 6:30. The German crew reported that the British aircraft had overflown their vessel from a height of 60–70 metres (200–230 ft), close enough for them to make out the aircraft's markings and presumed, therefore, that the aircrew could see Tübingen's markings. Two photographs taken by the crew shortly after the sinking at 8:20 showed that by then visibility was good and sea conditions were calm.

During the war, it had been recognised that in some cases it had been difficult for aircraft to readily identify hospital ships from the air and shortly after peace was declared it became a requirement for hospital ships to display the protected emblem (in this case, the red cross) so that it is visible from the air as well as from the sea.
