= Court-martial of Breaker Morant =

1902 prosecution of six British Army soldiers for crimes during the Second Boer War

The 1902 court-martial of Breaker Morant was a war crimes prosecution that brought to trial six officers – Lieutenants Harry "Breaker" Morant, Peter Handcock, George Witton, Henry Picton, Captain Alfred Taylor and Major Robert Lenehan – of the Bushveldt Carbineers (BVC), an irregular regiment of mounted rifles during the Second Boer War. The trial opened in Pietersburg during January 1902.

The charges, which were in part prompted by a "letter of complaint" which was written by BVC Trooper Robert Mitchell Cochrane and signed by James Christie and 14 other members of the BVC, were that Lieutenant Morant had incited the co-accused to murder some 20 people, including the wounded prisoner of war (POW) Floris Visser, a group of four Boer prisoners of war (POWs) and four Dutch schoolteachers, Boer civilian adults and children, and a Lutheran missionary named Rev. Daniel Heese. Morant and Handcock were acquitted of killing Heese, but were sentenced to death on the other two charges and executed within 18 hours of sentencing. Their death warrants were personally signed by Lord Kitchener.

It was not until 1907 that news of the trial and executions were made public in Australia when Witton published Scapegoats of the Empire. The Australian government subsequently ensured that none of its troops would be tried by the British military during World War I.

== Floris Visser ambush, capture and death ==
Floris J. Visser (c. 1881 – 11 August 1901) was an Afrikaner and member of the Letaba Commando, which fought for the Republic of Transvaal during the Second Anglo-Boer War. Visser's summary execution while a wounded prisoner of war was one of the alleged war crimes that were prosecuted in Morant's court martial. At the time of his death, Visser was about twenty years of age.

=== Capture ===
On the night of 6 August 1901, Visser was wounded in his ankle during an ambush of his Boer Commandos by a patrol of the Bushveldt Carbineers, an irregular unit of the British Army, led by Captain Percy Frederick Hunt. The ambush took place at the Viljoen homestead in Duivelskloof. During the same attack, the Commandos lost field cornet Barend Viljoen, his brother J.J. Viljoen, and F.J. Schell. The Bushveldt Carbineers lost Captain Hunt and Sergeant Frank Eland.

After the ambush, the remnants of the Letaba Commandos was pursued by a BVC patrol led by Lieutenant Morant. Although Morant had only arrived from Fort Edward after Captain Hunt's burial, he had been told rumours that Hunt's body had been mutilated. On the morning of 9 August 1901, Morant led a patrol consisting of both members of the Bushveldt Carbineers and warriors from the local Lobedu people. That evening, after coming upon the Letaba Commando's encampment in a gully, the patrol prepared to attack. Morant's Afrikaner adjutant, Trooper Theunis Botha, later recalled, "I may say here that for Morant's own cowardice the whole of the party would have been caught as every other man in the patrol will testify. Instead of going close up as he could easily have done and so closing the cordon he started firing at 2000 yards and would not go nearer."

Hearing the shots, the Letaba Commando scattered. As his comrades fled, Visser, who was unable to walk or ride, was left behind. The Bushveldt Carbineers found him lying under one of the wagons.

Trooper Botha later recalled, "I generally acted as interpreter for Lt Morant. On the evening on which Visser was captured I acted in that capacity. I asked Visser by Lieutenant Morant's request how Capt. Hunt was killed. He replied that he was killed in a fair fight, shot through the chest. Lieutenant Morant said his neck was broken. Visser vehemently denied it. Before commencing to ask these questions Lieutenant Morant said, 'If you tell the truth your life will be spared, if you tell lies you will be shot.' He then asked as to the plans of the Boers. Visser replied that the Boers did not intend to stay around there (Little Letaba) but were trekking to the Woodbush to join Beyers' Commando."

As the patrol continued their pursuit of the Viljoen Commando, Visser was carried along. Trooper Botha continued, "In the morning similar questions were again asked of him by Lieutenant Morant who again promised to spare his life if he answered truthfully. Visser answered every question truthfully as subsequent events proved."

=== Death ===
According to BVC Trooper Edward Powell, "After being captured he was conveyed in a cape cart about fifteen miles. When we outspanned I heard that Lieutenants Morant, Handcock, and Picton would hold a court-martial and that Visser would probably be shot. Visser was in the cart all the time to the best of my belief and was not present at the court-martial."

According to Trooper Botha, "When [Henry] Ledeboer told Visser he was about to be shot I heard Visser remind Lieutenant Morant through the interpreter that he had promised to spare his life if he had answered all his questions. Lieutenant Morant said, 'It is idle talk. We are going to shoot you,' or word to that effect."

According to Trooper James Christie, a New Zealander, when Morant ordered the patrol to form a firing squad, the men objected, and one of the Lieutenants shouted, "If you're so damn chicken-hearted I'll shoot him myself."

Before taking his place in the firing squad, Trooper Botha told Trooper Christie about Visser, "I know him good. I went to school with him. I don't like to do it, but they will shoot me if I don't." The squad consisted of BVC Troopers A.J. Petrie, J.J. Gill, Wild, and T.J. Botha. Trooper Christie watched as the Lobedu lifted Visser out of the cape cart in a blanket and laid him down twenty yards away in a sitting position with his back to the firing squad. Trooper Powell further alleged that the Lobedu danced "the war dance before Visser before he was shot." A volley rang out and Visser fell backwards from his sitting position. A coup de grâce was delivered by BVC Lt. Harry Picton. Lieutenant Morant then approached Trooper Christie and said, "I know it's hard times for him, but it's got to be done, see how the Boers knocked Captain Hunt about."

According to Trooper Christie, "I said that Captain Hunt had died a soldier's death - that he was killed in a 'fair go' and beyond being stripped there was no maltreatment of him; and how the Kaffirs [sic] might have stripped him. He said no; that Captain Hunt's tunic and trousers had been found in the Cape cart. 'But,' I said, 'the boy was not wearing them.' 'Anyhow,' he said, 'its got to be done. It's unfortunate that he should be the first to suffer.' I still held that it was not right to shoot him after carrying him for so far. But as up to this time Morant and I had been good friends I said no more, but tore off my 'B.V.C.' badge and cursed such a form of soldiering. Then we saddled up and trekked for home." On the orders of the officers, Visser was buried by the Lobedu in a shallow grave near Blas Perreira's Shop along the Koedoes River.

== The letter ==
On 4 October 1901, a letter signed by 15 members of the Bushveldt Carbineers (BVC) garrison at Fort Edward was secretly dispatched to Colonel F.H. Hall, the British Army Officer Commanding at Pietersburg, South Africa. The letter that was written by BVC Trooper Robert Mitchell Cochrane, a former Justice of the Peace from Kalgoorlie, Western Australia, accused members of the Fort Edward garrison of six "disgraceful incidents":

1. The shooting of six surrendered Afrikaner men and boys and the theft of their money and livestock at Valdezia on 2 July 1901. The orders had been given by Captains Alfred Taylor and James Huntley Robertson, and relayed by Sergeant Major K.C.B. Morrison to Sergeant D.C. Oldham. The actual killing was alleged to have been carried out by Sgt. Oldham and BVC Troopers Eden, Arnold, Brown, Heath, and Dale.
2. The shooting of BVC Trooper B.J. van Buuren by BVC Lieutenant Peter Handcock on 4 July 1901. Trooper van Buuren, an Afrikaner, had "disapproved" of the killings at Valdezia, and had informed the victims' wives and children, who were imprisoned at Fort Edward while awaiting shipment to concentration camps, of what had happened to their relatives.
3. The revenge killing of Floris Visser, a wounded prisoner of war, near the Koedoes River on 11 August 1901. Visser had been captured two days before his death by a BVC patrol led by Lieut. Harry Morant. After Visser had been exhaustively interrogated and conveyed for 15 miles by the patrol, Lieutenant Morant had ordered his men to form a firing squad and shoot him. The squad consisted of BVC Troopers A.J. Petrie, J.J. Gill, Wild, and T.J. Botha. A coup de grace was delivered by BVC Lieutenant Harry Picton. The killing of Floris Visser was in retaliation for the combat death of Morant's close friend, BVC Captain Percy Frederick Hunt, at Duivelskloof on 6 August 1901.
4. The shooting, ordered by Captain Taylor and Lieutenant Morant, of four surrendered Afrikaners and four Dutch schoolteachers, who had been captured at the Elim Hospital in Valdezia, on the morning of 23 August 1901. The firing squad consisted of BVC Lieutenant George Witton, Sgt. D.C. Oldham, and Troopers J.T. Arnold, Edward Brown, T. Dale, and A. Heath. Although Trooper Cochrane's letter made no mention of the fact, three Native South African witnesses were also shot dead.
  The ambush and fatal shooting of the Reverend Carl August Daniel Heese of the Berlin Missionary Society near Bandolierkop on the afternoon of 23 August 1901. Heese had spiritually counselled the Dutch and Afrikaner victims that morning and had angrily protested to Morant at Fort Edward upon learning of their deaths. Trooper Cochrane alleged that the killer of Heese was BVC Lieutenant Peter Handcock. Although Cochrane made no mention of the fact, Heese's driver, a member of the Southern Ndebele people, was also killed.
5. The orders, given by BVC Lieutenant Charles H.G. Hannam, to open fire on a wagon train containing Afrikaner women and children who were coming in to surrender at Fort Edward, on 5 September 1901. The ensuing gunfire led to the deaths of two boys, aged 5 and 13, and the wounding of a 9-year-old girl.
6. The shooting of Roelf van Staden and his sons Roelf, 16, and Christiaan, 12, near Fort Edward on 7 September 1901. All were coming in to surrender in the hope of gaining medical treatment for teenaged Christiaan, who had recurring bouts of fever. Instead, they were met at the Sweetwaters Farm near Fort Edward by a party consisting of Lieutenants Morant and Handcock, joined by BVC Sergeant Major Hammet, Corporal MacMahon, and Troopers Hodds, Botha, and Thompson. Roelf van Staden and both his sons were then shot, allegedly after being forced to dig their own graves.

The letter then accused the Field Commander of the BVC, Major Robert Lenahan, of being "privy these misdemeanours. It is for this reason that we have taken the liberty of addressing this communication direct to you." After listing numerous civilian witnesses who could confirm their allegations, Trooper Cochrane concluded, "Sir, many of us are Australians who have fought throughout nearly the whole war while others are Africaners who have fought from Colenso till now. We cannot return home with the stigma of these crimes attached to our names. Therefore, we humbly pray that a full and exhaustive inquiry be made by Imperial officers in order that the truth be elicited and justice done. Also we beg that all witnesses may be kept in camp at Pietersburg till the inquiry is finished. So deeply do we deplore the opprobrium which must be inseparably attached to these crimes that scarcely a man once his time is up can be prevailed to re-enlist in this corps. Trusting for the credit of thinking you will grant the inquiry we seek."

== Arrests ==
In response to the letter written by Trooper Cochrane, Colonel Hall summoned all Fort Edward officers and non-commissioned officers to Pietersburg on 21 October 1901. All were met by a party of mounted infantry five miles outside Pietersburg on the morning of 23 October 1901 and "brought into town like criminals". Morant was arrested after returning from leave in Pretoria, where he had gone to settle the affairs of his deceased friend Hunt.

== Indictments ==
Although the trial transcripts, like almost all others dating from between 1850 and 1914, were later destroyed by the Civil Service, it is known that a Court of Inquiry, the British military's equivalent to a grand jury, was convened on 16 October 1901. The President of the Court was Colonel H.M. Carter, who was assisted by Captain E. Evans and Major Wilfred N. Bolton, the Provost Marshal of Pietersburg. The first session of the Court took place on 6 November 1901 and continued for four weeks. Deliberations continued for a further two weeks; the indictments would be as follows:

1. In what became known as "The Six Boers Case", Captains Robertson and Taylor, as well as Sergeant Major Morrison, were charged with committing the offence of murder while on active service.
2. In relation to what was dubbed "The Van Buuren Incident", Lieutenant Handcock was charged with murder and Major Lenahan was charged with, "When on active service by culpable neglect failing to make a report which it was his duty to make."
3. In relation to "The Visser Incident", Lieutenants Morant, Handcock, Witton, and Picton were charged with "While on active service committing the offence of murder".
4. In relation to what was incorrectly dubbed "The Eight Boers Case", Morant, Handcock, and Witton were charged with "While on active service committing the offence of murder".
  In relation to the slaying of Heese; Morant and Handcock were charged with "While on active service committing the offence of murder".
5. No charges were filed for the three children who had been shot by the Bushveldt Carbineers near Fort Edward.
6. In relation to what became known as "The Three Boers Case", Morant and Handcock were charged with "While on active service committing the offence of murder".

In a confidential report to the War Office, Colonel J. St. Claire wrote:

I agree generally with the views expressed by the Court of Inquiry in the opinions of the several cases.
The idea that no prisoners were to be taken in the Spelonken area appears to have been started by the late Captain Hunt & after his death continued by orders given personally by Captain Taylor.
The statement that Captain Hunt's body had been maltreated is in no way corroborated & the reprisals undertaken by Lt Morant on this idea were utterly unjustifiable.
Lieut Morant seems to have been the primary mover in carrying out these orders, & Lieut Handcock willingly lent himself out as the principle executioner of them.
Lieut Morant acquiesced in the illegal execution of the wounded Boer Visser & took a personal part in the massacre of the 8 surrendered Boers on 23 August.
The two N.C.O.s acted under orders but were not justified in obeying illegal commands.
After the murder of Van Buuren the officers seem to have exercised a reign of terror in the District, which hindered their men from reporting their illegal acts & even prevented their objecting to assist in the crime.

== Courts martial ==
The first court martial opened on 16 January 1902, with Lieutenant-Colonel H.C. Denny presiding over a panel of six judges. Major James Francis Thomas, an Australian solicitor from Tenterfield, New South Wales, had been retained to defend Lenahan. The night before, however, he agreed to represent all six defendants.

The summary that follows is based upon the detailed summary of the trials that appeared in The Times of London and the memoirs of Lieut. George Witton.

=== The Visser trial ===
==== Initial charges ====
The "Visser Incident" was the first case to go to trial on 17 January 1902. The Court was composed of Lieutenant-Colonel Denny and five other officers. Major Copland was Judge Advocate and Captain R. Burns-Begg was Public Prosecutor. Lieuts. Morant, Hancock, Picton, and Witton "were charged with the murder of a wounded Boer prisoner named Visser. They pleaded Not Guilty and were defended by Major James Francis Thomas, New South Wales Mounted Rifles."

The prosecution called Sergeant S. Robinson, who testified about the attack on the Viljoen homestead at Duivelskloof, during which Captain Percy Frederick Hunt and Sergeant Frank Eland were killed. Sgt. Robinson testified that when he returned to the battlefield later, Captain Hunt's body had been stripped. Robinson then took the bodies to the Mendingen Mission Station, where his party was later reinforced by Lieuts. Morant, Handcock, Picton and Witton.

Sgt. Robinson testified that the following morning, "they went in pursuit of the Boers, overtook them, and captured their laager, finding one wounded Boer there." The following day, Visser, the wounded Boer, "accompanied the force some distance." During the dinner hour, Lieut. Morant "held a conversation in which", Visser, "who was in a car cart six yards away away, appeared to take no part." Lieut. Morant and Intelligence Scout Henry Ledeboer then approached Visser, "telling him that they were sorry, but that he had been found guilty of being in possession of the late Captain Hunt's clothing, and also of wearing khaki. Sgt. Robinson did not hear "what further was said, but was told to earn to men for duty." Sgt. Robinson "refused, asking Picton by whose orders this man was to be shot. Lieutenant Picton replied that the orders were from Lord Kitchener, naming a certain date, and were to the effect that all the Boers wearing khaki from that date were to be shot. The witness said he had never seen any such orders, which should have been posted or read regimentally."

During cross-examination by Major Thomas, Sgt. Robinson "said that Captain Hunt's body bore signs of ill-treatment." Furthermore, Visser, when captured, "had a kind of khaki jacket on." Sgt. Robinson further revealed that he had been told by the late Captain Hunt "that he had direct orders that no prisoners were to be taken". On one occasion, Sgt. Robinson had been "abused" by Captain Hunt "for bringing in three prisoners against orders." Sgt. Robinson further revealed that, prior to Captain Hunt's death at Duivelskloof, "Morant had previously been considerate to prisoners", but that afterwards, "He was in charge of the firing party that executed Visser."

The next witness for the prosecution was Morant's former orderly and interpreter – an Afrikaner "joiner" named Trooper Theunis J. Botha – who "corroborated the previous witness, and said that he was one of the firing party who carried out the sentence on Visser, who was carried down to a river and shot." Trooper Botha added that he "had previously lived with Visser on the same farm", and that he "objected to forming one of the firing party." Corporal Sharpe then took the stand and, "gave corroborative evidence", and added that after Visser was shot, a coup de grace was delivered by Lieutenant Picton. Although there is no account of this in The Times of London's account of the trial, Lieut. Witton alleges in his memoirs that Corporal Sharpe admitted under cross-examination by Major Thomas that he had expressed a willingness to cross South Africa on foot in return for a chance be in the firing squad that would execute the defendants.

==== Morant’s testimony ====
Henry Ledeboer, an Intelligence Scout for Captain Taylor, took the stand and testified that on the day in question "he translated the sentence of a Court-Martial that condemned Visser to be shot." Ledeboer admitted, however, that "the court-martial" consisted merely of a discussion between four officers – Lieuts. Morant, Picton, Handcock, and Witton. According to The Times, "The prisoners elected to give evidence on their own behalf." Taking the stand, Lieut. Morant said that he had served under the command of Captain Hunt, "with the force charged with clearing the northern district of Boers", and that "it was regular guerrilla warfare". Lieut. Morant further testified that Captain Hunt, in giving orders to shoot prisoners, "acted on orders he brought from Pretoria." Lieut. Morant explained that he once "brought in 30 prisoners" and that "Captain Hunt reprimanded him for bringing them in at all, and told him not to do it again."

Lieut. Morant further testified that he "took command after Captain Hunt was killed and went with reinforcements. When he learned the circumstances of Captain Hunt's death, and the way he had been maltreated", Lieut. Morant "followed the Boers and attacked their laager. The Boers cleared, leaving Visser, who had on a soldier's shirt, and was using Captain Hunt's trousers as a pillow. He was court-martialed and shot on this account." Lieut. Morant alleged that "the others all knew of Captain Hunt's orders." Lieut. Morant "had told them he had previously disregarded them, but after the way the Boers had treated Captain Hunt, he would carry out the orders which he regarded as lawful."

Although the account written in The Times makes no mention of it, Lieut. Witton alleges that the President of the Court then asked Lieut. Morant whether Visser's "court-martial" had been constituted like Morant's own court-martial, and whether the four "judges" had observed King's Regulations. Morant's reply, according to Witton, was: "Was it like this? No; it was not quite so handsome. As to rules and regulations, we had no Red Book, and knew nothing about them. We were out fighting the Boers, not sitting comfortably behind barb-wire entanglements; we got them and shot them under Rule 303!"

Under cross-examination by Major Thomas, Lieut. Morant alleged "that Captain Hunt's orders were to clear Spelonken and take no prisoners." Morant admitted, however, that "He had never seen these orders in writing", but that "Captain Hunt quoted the actions of Kitchener's and Strathcona's Horse as precedents." Lieut. Morant further explained that his reason for disobeying Captain Hunt was "because his captured were 'a good lot.'" Lieut. Morant further admitted that he "had shot no prisoners prior to Visser."

When asked about Visser's "court-martial", Lieut. Morant admitted that "No witnesses were called", as all present had been eyewitnesses. During the proceeding, Lieut. Picton had "raised an objection to Visser being shot, on the ground that he should have been shot the night before." When pressed about the reason why, Morant insisted that Captain Hunt had repeatedly ordered him not to take prisoners and that "he never questioned" the validity of those orders. Maj. Thomas then asked Lieut. Morant "whether he knew who gave the orders, but the Judge Advocate protested against the question, and was upheld by the Court after consultation."

==== Resumption of the trial and aftermath ====
When the trial resumed on 18 January 1902, "the Court allowed the question." Lieut. Morant then alleged that the late Captain Percy Frederick Hunt had received from Colonel Hubert Hamilton "the orders that no prisoners were to be taken." Lieut. Morant further alleged that many others, including Lieut. Peter Handcock, had received the same orders from Captain Hunt.

Despite Colonel Hall's role in ordering Lieut. Morant's arrest, Morant further alleged that the Colonel had known of the "court-martial" and execution of Visser, as an honest report was mailed to the Colonel within a fortnight of Visser's death. Morant alleged that a similar report also reached Captain Taylor. When pressed, however, Lieut. Morant admitted that he "had only Captain Hunt's word for it that Colonel Hamilton" had ordered the killing of prisoners. Lieut. Morant also admitted that he "had made no attempt to get his report" to Colonel Hall "as evidence."

Toward the end of the trial, the court moved to Pretoria, where Colonel Hamilton testified that he had "never spoken to Captain Hunt with reference to his duties in the Northern Transvaal". Though stunned, Major Thomas argued that his clients were not guilty because they believed that they "acted under orders". In response, Burns-Begg argued that they were "illegal orders" and said, "The right of killing an armed man exists only so long as he resists; as soon as he submits he is entitled to be treated as a prisoner of war." The Court ruled in the prosecution's favour.

Morant was found guilty of murder. Handcock, Witton, and Picton were convicted of the lesser charge of manslaughter. After observing the trial, Colonel A.R. Pemberton wrote to the War Office, "I consider that Lieut. Morant was properly convicted... The so-called Court was not a Court at all; it may be more justly called a consultation between 4 officers which ended in a party of subordinates being ordered to commit murder. A stronger case of implied malice aforethought has rarely been represented before any tribunal. I fail to understand on what grounds the other 3 prisoners were found guilty of manslaughter only. I disagree with this finding: From the evidence adduced I consider the 4 officers are jointly & severally responsible for the death of Visser & guilty of murder. I do not consider it proved that Visser was wearing British uniform."

=== Eight Boers case ===
The trial recommenced on 31 January 1902 with the four Afrikaners and four Dutch schoolteachers who had surrendered to a party led by Morant and Handcock at the Elim Hospital on the morning of 23 August 1901. The case had barely commenced before the prosecution counsel, Captain Burns-Begg, and two of the judges, Major Ousley and Captain Marshall, were replaced. Documents connected with the case reveal that Major R. Whigham and Colonel James St. Clair had ordered Major Wilfred N. Bolton to appear for the prosecution, as he was considered less expensive than hiring a barrister. Bolton vainly requested to be excused, writing, "My knowledge of law is insufficient for so intricate a matter." Meanwhile, Captains Matcham and Brown took the place of Ousley and Marshall.

The deposition of former BVC Corporal Albert van der Westerhuizen, the memoirs of George Witton, and the Transvaal War Museum archives reveal that, after the prisoners were taken, they were marched to a hillside nearby and forced to dig their own mass grave. Then, as planned in advance, Henry Lebeoer and Mr. Schwartz, two local Afrikaners assigned to Captain Taylor's staff, fired three shots to make it appear that the party was under attack by the Zoutpansberg Commando. All eight prisoners were then shot and buried in the mass grave which they had dug. According to South African historian Charles Leach, only five out of the eight victims were members of the Zoutpansberg Commando.

Witton alleged in his account that he shot a Boer who had lunged at him and attempted to grab his rifle. Other sources allege that the same man was a Dutch Reformed Church deacon and member of the Zoutpansberg Commando named C.J. Smit. According to South African historian Dr. C.A.R. Schulenburg, "Morant, Handcock, and Witton were found guilty of the murder of the eight Boers. Morant's defence was again that he was merely carrying out orders from senior officers 'not to bring any more prisoners in.'" After the conclusion of the Eight Boers hearing, the prisoners were placed in irons, taken to Pretoria by rail under heavy guard and tried on the third main count.

=== Heese case ===
The charge concerned the murder of the Lutheran missionary, Reverend Daniel Heese, who had spiritually counselled the eight Afrikaner and Dutch victims at Valdezia. It opened on 17 February, with Major Bolton alleging that Heese had been ambushed and shot by Handcock on the orders of Morant. Handcock was charged with murder and Morant with inciting.

=== Three Boers case ===
Morant and Handcock stood accused of ordering certain troopers and a corporal to shoot Roelf van Staden and both his sons. They were found guilty.

== Attack on Pietersburg ==
While the trial was underway, Boer commandos launched a surprise attack on Pietersburg. Morant and his co-accused were released from their cells and given arms in order to participate in the defence. It is reported that they fought bravely, in the direct line of fire and assisted in the defeat of the attackers. Although Major Thomas filed a "plea of condonation", which can earn them clemency because of their roles in the defence; his request was dismissed by the court.

The principle of condonation in military law traces back to the "Memorandum on Corporal Punishment" issued by the Duke of Wellington on 4 March 1832:

"The performance of a duty of honour or of trust, after the knowledge of an offence committed by a soldier, ought to convey a pardon for the offence.

== Superior orders defence ==
Major Thomas argued that summary executions of surrendered members of the Boer Commandos were justified under what became known, half a century later, as the Nuremberg Defense: namely, that the defendants could not be held criminally or morally responsible because they only followed orders from Lord Kitchener to "take no prisoners".

In the trial itself, Lieutenant Colonel Hubert Hamilton categorically denied giving Captain Percy Frederic Hunt orders to shoot POWs; he also denied the existence of a coded telegram from him to Lord Roberts. Even so, Thomas still demanded the acquittal of his clients on the grounds that they believed they acted under orders. In response, the prosecutor argued that, even if Kitchener had ordered the shooting of prisoners, they were "illegal orders", and that the defendants had no right to obey them. The judges agreed with the prosecution and found the defendants guilty.

== Conviction and sentencing ==
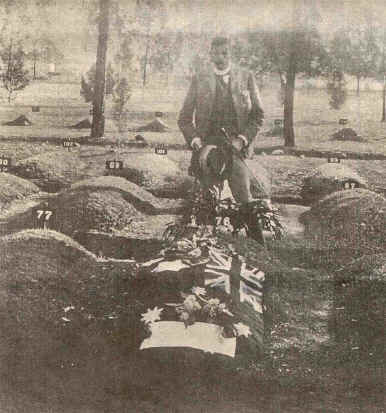
Major Thomas standing over the joint grave of Morant and Handcock (1902)

External image
- Photo of the grave of Morant and Handcock. Source:Genealogical Society of South Africa

Morant and Handcock were sentenced to death and executed by firing squad on the morning of 27 February 1902, less than 18 hours after the verdict. Witton had also been sentenced to death, but this was commuted to life in prison by Kitchener (he was released by the British House of Commons on 11 August 1904 and died in 1942). Picton was cashiered, and Lenehan was reprimanded and discharged. All charges against the British intelligence officer Captain Taylor (died 1941) were dismissed.

== Aftermath ==
News of the execution of the two Australians was published in March 1902, and the Australian Government requested particulars of the case. The Australian debate was revived in 1907 after Witton returned to Australia and published his story, Scapegoats of the Empire. The Australian government insisted that none of its troops would be tried by the British military during World War I. Morant and Handcock have become folk heroes in modern Australia.

According to South African historian Charles Leach, "In the opinion of many South Africans, particularly descendants of victims as well as other involved persons in the far Northern Transvaal, justice was only partially achieved by the trial and the resultant sentences. The feeling still prevails that not all the guilty parties were dealt with – the notorious Captain Taylor being the most obvious one of all."

=== Floris Visser ===
Even though Floris Visser had revealed information that placed his comrades at risk, his name was posthumously added to the Soutpansberg Commando's Roll of Honour. Visser's name does not appear, however, at the Heroes Acre Monument in Duivelskloof, which lists the names of all local Afrikaners who were killed during the Second Anglo-Boer War. He has, however, been added to the monument to civilian casualties at Fort Edward, the monument at Blas Perreira's Store, and the monument at the Viljoen family homestead. Despite efforts by the South African Government and by local residents to find and mark his grave, the location of Visser's burial remains a mystery.

== In popular culture ==
Their court-martial and death have been the subject of books, a stage play by Kenneth G. Ross, and an Australian New Wave film adaptation by director Bruce Beresford. Upon its release in 1980, Beresford's film significantly raised awareness of Morant's life story.

Many Australians now regard Lts. Morant and Handcock as scapegoats or even as the victims of judicial murder. Attempts continue, with widespread public support, to obtain them a posthumous pardon or even a new trial. South Africans who oppose this effort, however, have cited as precedents the trial of Peter von Hagenbach, the 1813 prosecution of Ensign Hugh Maxwell for murdering French POW Charles Cottier at Glencorse Barracks near Penicuik, Scotland, during the Napoleonic Wars, and the United States Army's court martial of the servicemen responsible for the My Lai Massacre during the Vietnam War. The fact that Major James Thomas' superior orders defence argument was also used by so many of those prosecuted for Nazi war crimes at the Nuremberg Trials that it is now called the Nuremberg Defense, has also been cited as an argument.

In a 1999 interview, Beresford said about his award-winning film adaptation of the court-martial proceedings, "I read an article about it recently in the Los Angeles Times and the writer said it's the story of these guys who were railroaded by the British. But that's not what it's about at all. The film never pretended for a moment that they weren't guilty. It said they are guilty. But what was interesting about it was that it analysed why men in this situation would behave as they had never behaved before in their lives. It's the pressures that are put to bear on people in war time. Look at the atrocities in Yugoslavia. Look at all the things that happen in these countries committed by people who appear to be quite normal. That was what I was interested in examining. I always get amazed when people say to me that this is a film about poor Australians who were framed by the Brits."

== See also ==
- Breaker Morant (film) – 1980 film by Bruce Beresford
- Breaker Morant (play) – Play written by Kenneth G. Ross
- Military history of Australia
- Command responsibility – Doctrine of hierarchical accountability
- Condonation (Military law) – Legal defense
- Nuremberg defense – Criminal defense of following the orders of a superior
- Pardons for Morant, Handcock and Witton – Petitions for Australian Second Boer War soldiers
- War crimes trials – Type of trial under international law
- nullum crimen sine lege
- Nulla poena sine culpa
