= Alfred Taylor (British Army officer) =

Anglo-Irish military officer

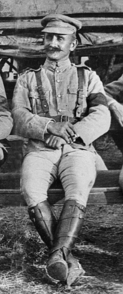
- Taylor c. 1901
- Born: Alfred James Taylor; 14 November 1861; Dublin, Ireland
- Died: 24 October 1941 (aged 79); Bulawayo, Southern Rhodesia
- Other name: Alfred James "'Bulala" Taylor
- Military career
- Allegiance: British Empire
- Rank: Captain
- Unit: British South Africa Police
- Conflicts: Second Boer War

Captain Alfred James "'Bulala" Taylor (14 November 1861 – 24 October 1941) was an Anglo-Irish military officer who was active in Africa during the Scramble for Africa and the Second Boer War. He is best known as a defendant in one of the first war crimes prosecutions in British military history. Born into a middle-class Protestant family in Dublin, Ireland, Taylor jumped ship in Cape Town in 1886 and served in the British South Africa Police of the British South Africa Company (BSAC). He played a major role in the colonisation of modern-day Zimbabwe by the BSAC. During two subsequent uprisings by the Northern Ndebele people against Company rule in Rhodesia, Taylor was dubbed by the Ndebele "Bulala" ("He Who Kills") and "Bamba" ("He Who Takes").

Taylor is most infamous, however, for his actions during the Second Boer War. While serving as a captain in the War Office's Intelligence Department, Taylor was handpicked by Lord Kitchener as liaison to the Bushveldt Carbineers (BVC) at Fort Edward in the Northern Transvaal. South African historian C. A. R. Schulenburg has described "The Irishman Taylor" as "a notorious sadist", who was "ruthless" toward white and black South Africans alike. In October 1901, a letter accusing Taylor and other officers of crimes against the laws and customs of war was signed by 15 enlisted members of the BVC and mailed to the officer commanding at Pietersburg. In response, Taylor was arrested by British military police and put on trial at Pietersburg.

In the subsequent trial, Taylor was accused of ordering the murders of six unarmed Afrikaner men and boys at Valdezia on 2 July 1901 and the theft of their money and livestock. He was also charged with the murder of an unarmed Black man, who had refused to reveal the hiding place of his Boer employer. Australian Army officer J. F. Thomas, Taylor's defence attorney, managed to secure an acquittal on both charges. Taylor voluntarily resigned from military service, returned to Southern Rhodesia, and died at Bulawayo on 24 October 1941. In the award-winning Australian New Wave film Breaker Morant, Taylor is portrayed onscreen by John Waters.

== Early life ==
Alfred Taylor was born into a middle class Anglican family in Dublin on 14 November 1861. His father, William Taylor, was a lawyer. His mother, Charlotte Bennett, was the daughter of an Anglo-Irish auctioneer and land agent. His father died in Texas in 1877 and his mother in 1879 and, at the age of 17, Taylor had to make his own way in the world. According to his unpublished memoirs, he became a merchant seaman and eventually became a ship's engineer. In 1886, Taylor was employed on a voyage between British India and Europe, when he jumped ship in Cape Town, and disappeared. After drifting to the Protectorate of Bechuanaland, he worked assembling machinery for the goldmines in Tati.

== Rhodesia ==
Taylor then joined the British South Africa Police of the British South Africa Company (BSAC). In so doing, he played a major role in the BSAC's colonization of Matabeleland and the establishment of the colony of Rhodesia. Taylor preceded the Pioneer Column to Bulawayo, where he befriended King Lobengula of Matabeleland. In 1889, he witnessed the Rudd Concession signed between the King and the British South Africa Company. During the First Matabele War of 1893, Taylor acted as a guide to Cecil Rhodes. According to Taylor's unpublished memoirs and the "Plumtree Papers" by Mrs. Clarke, he had an argument with Rhodes whilst escorting him secretly to Bulawayo, threatening to abandon him.

According to South African historian Arthur Davey, Taylor was so feared among the Native population of Rhodesia that he received two nicknames in the Ndebele language: "Bulala" ("He Who Kills") and "Bamba" ("He Who Takes"). According to Australian Army Captain Frederick de Bertodano, "Bulala Taylor was an Irishman who had spent years among the natives and was known as a sadist. He frequently stirred up trouble in native Kraals and then shot some native 'in self defence', as he always stated. He was notorious and was distrusted by most white men he came into contact with." Taylor later wrote that his Rhodesian estate, the Avoca Farm near Plumtree, was granted to him by Queen Victoria in return for services rendered.

During the Second Matabele War, Lt. Taylor commanded a unit of Mounted Scouts with Lieutenant-Colonel Herbert Plumer's Matabeleland Relief Force. During the Battle of Thabas Amamba, Lt. Taylor "fired the first shot of the day" at a fleeing Ndebele whom he failed to wound or kill. His Mounted Scouts lost two killed and two wounded in the ensuing action. During the same battle, Lt. Taylor "caught sight of" an enemy combatant who "was dressed in a suit of khaki and was not a Matabele". Although Taylor "gave it as his opinion that" he had seen "a Basuto, fighting with the rebels", the incident "gave rise to the rumour that the rebels were led by white men." In a handwritten account of his military service, Taylor claimed to have had "command of Plumer's Scouts" between 1896 and 1897. He further claimed to have been "shot through the leg in the Matopos in 1896".

== Boer War ==
Lieutenant Taylor was recalled to active duty during the Second Boer War and rose to the rank of captain in the Intelligence Department of the War Office. According to historian Arthur Keppel-Jones, there was concern, upon the outbreak of hostilities in 1899, of an attack by the Boer Commandos against the Rhodesian railway lines. For this reason, four squadrons of Gen. Herbert Plumer's Rhodesian Regiment were deployed between Rhodes Drift and the Shashi Junction. Keppel-Jones elaborates, "The Boers, fearing an invasion from the north, placed the Waterberg and Soutpansberg Commandos, under Assistant Commandant-General F.A. Grobler, on that front. His task was to forestall invasion by raiding right up to Bulawayo. Grobler and his subordinate, Assistant-General H.C. van Rensburg, being timid and unenterprising officers, the task was not carried out. Plumer, on the other hand, was under orders to act on the defensive, protect the border, and not invade the Transvaal without a specific order."

Captain Taylor described in a 1905 letter how, in 1900, he was "sent to the Transvaal to get information on Boer movements", which he "did to Genl. Plumer's satisfaction". On his return, Taylor was briefly "left in charge of the Detachment of A Squadron" until being ordered "to join Genl. Plumer at Crocodile Pools on the road to the Relief of Mafeking. I remained with him till I got Dysentery so bad I was sent back to Bulawayo Hospital." Upon his recovery, Taylor received "a wire from HQ Pretoria" ordering him "to report to Col Wood in Bulawayo. There I met a man named Keith who informed me that Lord Kitchener wanted me to find a way to Fort Botha, which was situated in the Makato Mountains."

=== Arrival in Northern Transvaal ===
Leading a party of six members of the Intelligence Department, Captain Taylor followed the Crocodile River until reaching the Soutpansberg Range. While interviewing Chief Madumetsa of the Mamadi People, Captain Taylor "began to suspect" the Chief of "collaboration or support for the Boers" and had him shot dead. Chief Madumetsa "was later buried by his tribesmen in the foothills of the nearby Zoutpansberg to the west of the Sand River." Upon reaching Fort Botha, Taylor found it occupied "by only two men named Lottering and Erasmus and from them I found out that the Boer Commando was at the foot of the hills and that they had a telephone attachment to Louis Trichardt, I broke up the machine and cut off all communication by wire to Pietersburg and the surrounding district."

=== The Attack on Perdeplaas Farm ===
On 4 May 1901, Capt. Taylor was part of a patrol which arrived at the Perdeplaas Farm (now Zwarthoek), near the peak of the Soutpansberg Range, to transport the wife and children of Zoutpansberg Commando member Coenraad Jacobus van den Berg to the concentration camp at Pietersburg. Unbeknownst to Taylor, C. J. van den Berg had caught a "fever, probably malaria", and had been sent home to recover. Before the British patrol had arrived, the Burgher had retreated to some nearby rocks and instructed his wife to wave her bonnet if she felt threatened. When the patrol began looting the farm, Mrs. van den Berg waved her bonnet and her husband opened fire. In a brief exchange of fire, a shot from C.J. van den Berg's rifle severely injured a member of the patrol, R. H. Summers.

In a 1905 letter, Taylor recalled being certain that, "owing to the firing, the Boers heard we were there." Therefore, before clearing "into the mountains", a ceasefire was called. The van den Berg family was promised that no harm would come to them if they cared for Summers until a patrol returned for him. However, Summers later died and was buried on a nearby farm. Taylor and his men remained "in the mountains for 14 days" until being "relieved by Cols Grenfell and Colenbrander when they took Louis Trichardt."

On 9 May 1901, Cols. Johan William Colenbrander and H.L. Grenfell rode into Louis Trichardt ahead of a mixed force of about 600 men. In addition to Kitchener's Fighting Scouts, the force included elements of the Pietersburg Light Horse, the Wiltshire Regiment, the Bushveldt Carbineers (BVC), a large force of Native South African and Indigenous Australian "Irregulars" and six members of the Intelligence Department under Taylor's command. Even though Trichardt was "reeling from the annual effects of malaria", British and Imperial forces sacked the town and arrested an estimated 90 male residents suspected of links to the Zoutpansberg Commando.

On 10 May 1901, Captain Taylor returned to the Perdeplaas Farm to "even the score" with C.J. van den Berg. Although the latter was "bed-ridden and barely able to walk", Mrs. van den Berg and their daughter were ordered to bring him to the door. Once they did so, C.J. van den Berg told his family in Afrikaans that the soldiers were going to kill him and kissed them goodbye. After walking only a few paces from the house, Burgher van den Berg was summarily shot by an ad hoc firing squad and buried in a shallow grave. His wife and children were given "five minutes to get your things". The farmhouse was then burned down and the van den Berg family was transported to the concentration camp at Pietersburg. According to the deposition of Australian Bushveldt Carbineers Trooper Robert Mitchell Cochrane, the cattle herds from Perdeplaas Farm were stolen by Captain Taylor. They were secretly driven across the Rhodesian border, and sold in Bulawayo, where Boer Commando attacks against the southern railway lines had more than doubled the price of food.

On 11 May 1901, the remaining residents of Louis Trichardt, including both the Afrikaner and "Cape Coloured" populations, were ordered to evacuate the town. According to local resident E. R. Smith, British and Imperial forces helped themselves to whatever "curios" they wanted and allowed the civilian population only a short time to gather their things. The town of Louis Trichardt was then burned down by Native South African "Irregulars" under the supervision of Captain Taylor. The civilian population was force marched between 11 and 18 May to the concentration camp at Pietersburg. According to South African historian Charles Leach, Captain Taylor "emphatically told" the local Venda and Sotho communities "to help themselves to the land and whatever else they wanted as the Boers would not be returning after the war."

== Whistleblower ==
In May 1901, Captain Frederick de Bertodano, an Australian intelligence officer attached to Lord Kitchener's Staff, arrived at Pietersburg intending to speak with Major Robert Lenehan, the Field Commander of the Bushveldt Carbineers. Finding Lenehan away, de Bertodano was shocked to find Captain Taylor there as Lenehan's second in command. Captain de Bertodano, who remembered Taylor from the Matabeleland Rebellion in 1896, later recalled, "Neither his face nor his eyes prepossessed me and his reputation stank to Heaven."

Upon his return to Pretoria, Bertodano reported to the Director of Military Intelligence, Colonel Henderson and informed him of Taylor's reputation. Captain de Bertodano later recalled, "I urged him to see if it were possible to cancel Taylor's appointment, as trouble was bound to ensue! The D.M.I. reported to Lord Kitchener and the matter was discussed, but it was found to be very difficult. There were other matters of importance demanding attention. "Major George Milne and I discussed the matter at length as I was seriously perturbed; however, I was told to 'keep an eye' on Bulala Taylor, for which I felt no gratitude to H.Q.s!!"

== Officer commanding ==
=== Sweetwaters Hotel ===
On 7 June 1901, Lord Kitchener dispatched A Squadron of the Bushveldt Carbineers, under the command of Captain James Huntley Robertson, from Pietersburg "to establish a forward base camp" at Sweetwaters Farm and Hotel, near Valdezia. With Captain Robertson was Taylor, who had been appointed as Acting Native Commissioner, and a detachment of men from the Intelligence Department. Captain Taylor's staff included several "joiners", as defectors from the local Boer Commandos were called at the time. At the time, the new commander of the Soutpansberg and Waterberg Commandos, Assistant-Commandant General Christian Frederick Beyers, was encamped at Sweetwaters Farm. He did not wish, however, to cause trouble for Charlie and Olivia Bristow, who owned the Sweetwaters Farm and Hotel, and ordered his men to break camp and withdraw from the premises.

Upon their arrival, Captain Taylor "established his headquarters in one section of the Sweetwaters Hotel", while "Captain Robertson and his men set up their tent and horse lines a short distance" to the southwest. Captain Robertson, who "wore lace cuffs and stood on a plank to keep his immaculately polished riding boots out of the mud", was regarded as "a bit of a dandy" by his men, who "had no respect for him." Accordingly, he "deferred excessively" to Captain Taylor, who became the de facto commanding officer of Fort Edward and the surrounding district.

=== Ethnic cleansing and war rape ===
Although Kitchener denied it later, Taylor armed and commandeered Black South Africans "on a large scale to help fight the Boers". According to British anti-war activist Emily Hobhouse, local African chiefs were urged by Taylor "to burn and destroy all the Boers had and to give no quarter, take no prisoners." Chiefs who obeyed were allegedly promised money and urged to subject Afrikaner women and girls to what is now called forced marriage and war rape. Hobhouse elaborated, "These armed men with assegais and rifles swept the farms in this district and now enjoy considerable flocks and herds they looted. To the lonely women they were such a menace that numbers of husbands surrendered after the occupation of Pietersburg, leaving their sons in the field. When at last the families were concentrated, entire Black Commandos (equipped and supported by the British) brought them in." Meanwhile, Taylor waged a war of extermination against the local Tsonga people. So indiscriminate was Taylor's use of violence that the Tsonga still refer to him as Bulala zonke Matshangana, ("The Killer of all the Tsonga").

Bushveldt Carbineers Lt. George Witton later wrote of Captain Taylor, "As far as the natives were concerned, he had a free hand and the power of life and death; he was known and feared by them from the Zambezi to the Spelonken, and was called by them Bulala which means to kill, to slay. He had the power to order out a patrol when he required it, and it was generally understood that he was the officer commanding at Spelonken. At the trials of the officers later, he admitted in evidence that he held this position." According to Captain de Bertodano, "The natives loathed and feared Bulala Taylor at his first appearance owing to his reputation in Matabeleland which had quickly followed him. His domination of Major Lenehan and other officers was evident even to the 'boys' at Fort Edward."

== Valdezia massacre ==
=== Prelude ===
On 2 July 1901, Captain Taylor received word that a group of six Boers were coming into the fort, accompanied by two covered wagons and a large herd of cattle. In response, the Captain sent a runner to summon troops from the Bushveldt Carbineers. Upon their arrival, Capt. Taylor told them that Fort Edward was about to be attacked. Therefore, he ordered a party under BVC Sergeant Major K.C.B. Morrison to intercept the six Boers. He instructed him to "make it look like a fight", ignore a white flag if one were flown, and take no prisoners. After listening, Sgt.-Maj. Morrison turned to BVC Capt. James H. Robertson and asked whether he should obey Taylor's orders. Robertson replied, "Certainly, he is commanding officer at Spelonken." In response to Capt. Taylor's orders, Sgt.-Maj. Morrison dispatched a patrol under the command of BVC Sergeant D.C. Oldham to intercept the six Boers. In addition to Sgt. Oldham, the patrol consisted of BVC Corporal V.C. Primrose and Troopers Eden, Arnold, Brown, Heath, and Dale.

=== Massacre ===
In reality, while four of the Boer group were members of the Zoutpansberg Commando, they were off-duty, suffering from malaria, and were on the way to seek medical treatment at the Valdezia clinic. Their known names were Jan F. Vercuil, F.J.G. Potgieter, Jan J. Geyser, P.J. Geyser, J.C. Greyling, and M. van Heerden. After the end of the war, the daughter of Jan Geyser recalled that day in a letter to former military prosecutor Maj. Wilfred Bolton. Her father, who was then aged 65, was bed-ridden and had recruited 18-year-old F. Potgieter to help manage the oxen and wagons. Potgieter in turn asked 12-year-old P.J. Geyser to assist him. Miss Geyser also recalled that her father had been a very wealthy man and had several fine teams of draught oxen and a large herd of valuable cattle with him. She added that he had an estimated £800 in gold bars and a large sum in £5 notes inside a wooden cash box in the wagon. Upon reaching the clinic at Valdezia, the party were told that only the Swiss-run Elim Hospital, 10 km away, was equipped to treat malaria.

Meanwhile, Sgt. Oldham's patrol had been dispatched from Sweetwaters Hotel on a course to intercept. Upon reaching the Fairview Farm of Alexander Pittendrigh, Troopers J.T. Heath, Arnold, and A. Heath were sent ahead to scout. On sighting the wagon train, Trooper Heath hid in the grass while Trooper Arnold returned to Fairview Farm to summon the rest of the patrol. When all seven troopers were in place, Sgt. Oldham ordered them to open fire on the wagons. After a white flag was raised, Oldham ordered his men to cease fire, believing that women and children might be present. Sgt. Oldham then ordered Corporal Primrose to ride back to Sweetwaters and deliver a report. As they advanced on the wagons and disarmed the six men and boys, Sgt. Oldham reminded his men of Capt. Taylor's orders and assigned a victim to each trooper. According to historian Charles Leach, "A .303 calibre volley reverberated down the Levubu River valley and four men and a young boy fell dead on the dirt road." Trooper A. Heath later recalled that Jan Geyser was lying sick in his wagon and that BVC Trooper Eden "climbed into the wagon and shot him where he lay on his bed."

=== Burial and looting ===
After a ride lasting an estimated one and a half hours, Corporal Primrose arrived at Sweetwaters and reported that all six Afrikaners had surrendered and been subsequently shot. The main body of A Squadron began riding toward the scene and arrived a few hours later. In a subsequent deposition, BVC Shoeing-Smith Allen Staton recalled, "Then we rode on until we came across five Boers lying on the road dead and one lying dead in the wagon under his blankets never having got out of bed. The latter was shot in the head. The five lying in the road were shot in the head save one who was shot in the neck. They had no arms and from the position in which the bodies were lying it was evident they had not died fighting. It looked to me just like an execution. I saw both Captain Taylor and Captain Robertson ride on the scene while the bodies were lying there unburied."

After the scene was inspected by Captains Robertson and Taylor, the bodies of all six victims were buried in a mass grave by Quarter-Master Sergeant H.J. Venables. The cash box, gold bars, oxen and cattle were never returned to the Geyser family. In a subsequent deposition, BVC Trooper Solomon King recalled seeing Lt. Peter Handcock "walk past carrying the cash box which had been taken from the wagon. He held it up and said, 'There is over £100 in here in paper money.' I said, 'I thought it was over £1000. Can't you divide it among us?' He said, 'No, I can't do nothing like that.'" According to the deposition of BVC Trooper Robert Mitchell Cochrane, the oxen and cattle were stolen by Captain Taylor, secretly driven to Rhodesia, and sold at Bulawayo.

=== Murder of Trooper B.J. van Buuren ===
When the patrol returned to Fort Edward on 2 July 1901, BVC Trooper B.J. van Buuren, an Afrikaner, was seen pointing out Sgt. Maj. Morrison's men to a group of Afrikaner women and children who were being held for transport to the concentration camp at Pietersburg. Knowing that the prisoners included the families of the victims and certain that Trooper van Buuren had told them about the massacre in Afrikaans, Capts. Robertson and Taylor ordered Lt. Handcock to "attend to the matter".

On 4 July 1901, Lt. Handcock led a handpicked patrol of four men, including Trooper van Buuren, from Fort Edward to "investigate Boer activity close by". In a subsequent deposition, Trooper M.A. Churton described having seen Lt. Handcock ride up behind Trooper van Buuren and shoot him three times in the back. Lt. Handcock then allegedly rode up to Trooper Churton and said, "Keep a sharp lookout. We just lost a man back there." At Captain Robertson's orders, van Buuren's body was returned to Fort Edward for burial. Although Lt. Handcock wrote a report on the incident, it was edited by Capt. Robertson, "who deemed it unsuitable and thus edited it to read that Van Buuren had been shot in contact with some Boers. This 'official version' of Van Buuren's death was then sent to Pietersburg", where Major Robert Lenehan, the Field Commander of the BVC, "accepted it in good faith".

== Captain Percy Hunt ==
In his report to BVC Major Lenehan about the massacre at Valdezia, Captain Robertson described the six victims as "train-wreckers and murderers" and allegedly recommended himself for the Distinguished Service Order. Meanwhile, reports had reached the officer commanding at Pietersburg "of poor discipline, unconfirmed murders, drunkenness, and general lawlessness in the Spelonken." It was further rumored that a local woman had accused a British officer of sexual assault. When further investigation revealed that the accused individual was Robertson, the latter was recalled to HQ and given a choice between court martial and resigning his commission. Robertson submitted his resignation from his unit, bringing an end to his military career.

In response, Captain Percy Frederic Hunt, "an Englishman, a former Lieutenant in Kitchener's Fighting Scouts, and a fine horseman" was ordered to the Northern Transvaal and given command of the Bushveldt Carbineers "B Squadron". Before departing Pietersburg on the night of 11 July 1901, Captain Hunt successfully "requested the transfer of certain officers and friends of his" to his new field of command. These men included Lts. Harry Morant, Charles Hannam, and Harry Picton.

== The letter ==
On 4 October 1901, a letter signed by 15 members of the Bushveldt Carbineers (BVC) garrison at Fort Edward was secretly dispatched to Col. F. H. Hall, the officer commanding at Pietersburg. The author of the letter and the driving force behind it was BVC Trooper Robert Mitchell Cochrane, a former mining engineer and Justice of the Peace from Kalgoorlie, Western Australia. Trooper Cochrane's letter accused his fellow members of the Fort Edward garrison of six "disgraceful incidents":

1. The shooting of six surrendered Afrikaner men and boys and the theft of their money and livestock at Valdezia on 2 July 1901.

2. The shooting of BVC Trooper B.J. van Buuren by BVC Lt. Peter Handcock on 4 July 1901.

3. The revenge killing of Floris Visser, a wounded prisoner of war, near the Koedoes River on 11 August 1901. Visser had been captured by a BVC patrol let by Lieut. Harry Morant two days before his death. After Visser had been exhaustively interrogated and conveyed for 15 miles by the patrol, Lt. Morant had ordered his men to form a firing squad and shoot him. The squad consisted of BVC Troopers A.J. Petrie, J.J. Gill, Witton, and T.J. Botha. A coup de grace was delivered by BVC Lt. Harry Picton. The slaying of Floris Visser was in retaliation for the combat death of Morant's close friend, BVC Captain Percy Frederic Hunt, at Duivelskloof on 6 August 1901.

4. The shooting, ordered by Capt. Taylor and Lt. Morant, of four surrendered Afrikaners and four Dutch schoolteachers, who had been captured at the Elim Hospital, on the morning of 23 August 1901. The firing squad consisted of BVC Lt. George Witton, Sgt. D.C. Oldham, and Troopers J.T. Arnold, Edward Brown, T. Dale, and A. Heath. Although Trooper Cochrane's letter made no mention of the fact, three Black South African witnesses were also shot dead. The ambush and fatal shooting of the Reverend Carl August Daniel Heese of the Berlin Missionary Society near Bandolierkop on the afternoon of 23 August 1901. Rev. Heese had spiritually counseled the Dutch and Afrikaner victims that morning and had angrily protested to Lt. Morant at Fort Edward upon learning of their deaths. Trooper Cochrane alleged that the killer of Rev. Heese was BVC Lt. Peter Handcock. Although Cochrane made no mention of the fact, Rev. Heese's driver, a member of the Southern Ndebele people, was also killed.

5. The orders, given by BVC Lt. Charles Hannam, to open fire on a wagon train containing Afrikaner women and children who were coming in to surrender at Fort Edward, on 5 September 1901. The ensuing gunfire led to the deaths of two boys, aged 5 and 13 years, and the wounding of a 9-year-old girl.

6. The shooting of Roelf van Staden and his sons Roelf and Christiaan, near Fort Edward on 7 September 1901. All were coming in to surrender in the hope of gaining medical treatment for teenaged Christiaan, who was suffering from recurring bouts of fever. Instead, they were met at the Sweetwaters Farm near Fort Edward by a party consisting of Lts. Morant and Handcock, joined by BVC Sgt. Maj. Hammet, Corp. MacMahon, and Troopers Hodds, Botha, and Thompson. Roelf van Staden and both his sons were then shot, allegedly after being forced to dig their own graves. Trooper Cochrane then cited evidence that the Australian-born Field Commander of the BVC, Major Robert Lenehan, was "privy to these misdeamenours. It is for this reason that we have taken the liberty of addressing this communication direct to you."

After listing numerous civilian witnesses who could confirm his accusations, Trooper Cochrane concluded, "Sir, many of us are Australians who have fought throughout nearly the whole war while others are Africaners who have fought from Colenso till now. We cannot return home with the stigma of these crimes attached to our names. Therefore we humbly pray that a full and exhaustive inquiry be made by Imperial officers in order that the truth be elicited and justice done. Also we beg that all witnesses may be kept in camp at Pietersburg till the inquiry is finished. So deeply do we deplore the opprobrium which must be inseparably attached to these crimes that scarcely a man once his time is up can be prevailed to re-enlist in this corps. Trusting for the credit of thinking you will grant the inquiry we seek."

== Arrest and indictment ==
=== Arrest ===
In response, Capt. Taylor was arrested by Royal Military Police at Pietersburg, where he had been recalled three weeks earlier. Hoping to evade prosecution, he resigned his commission, but was still held awaiting trial. On 11 October 1901 Australian BVC Trooper R.M. Cochrane wrote to Major Wilfred Bolton and recalled the fallout from Floris Visser's murder, "After the shooting of the wounded Boer F. Visser, the faithful Kaffirs [sic] refused to reveal the whereabouts of their Boer masters. Presumably, they tended them themselves in the bush. One Kaffir (sic), when commanded by Capt. Taylor to reveal the whereabouts of a wounded Boer curtly replied, 'Kona', which was a direct refusal. Capt. Taylor shot him dead with his revolver."

According to South African historian Dr. C.A.R. Schulenburg, all prisoners, including Taylor, "were kept in solitary confinement. Nobody, not even the prison chaplain, was permitted to visit them; they were not allowed to obtain advice for their defence until the evening before the start of the court martial, and they were not allowed to communicate with each other. They were not informed of the charges against them. They all assumed that they had simply done their duty according to orders from higher authority."

=== Indictment ===
A Court of Inquiry was convened at Pietersburg. It consisted of Colonel H.M. Carter, his secretary Captain E. Evans, and Major Wilfred N. Bolton. The first sitting took place on 21 November 1901. Sessions continued for four weeks followed by a further two weeks of deliberations. The main indictments were filed against Lieuts. Morant, Handcock, Witton, and Picton. Alfred Taylor was charged only with the murders of the six Afrikaners slain during the Valdezia Massacre. After observing the proceedings, Col. J. St. Claire wrote a confidential report to the War Office, "I agree generally with the views expressed by the Court of Inquiry in the opinions of the several cases. The idea that no prisoners were to be taken in the Spelonken area appears to have been started by the late Captain Hunt & after his death continued by orders given personally by Captain Taylor.

"The statement that Captain Hunt's body had been maltreated is in no way corroborated & the reprisals undertaken by Lt Morant on this idea were utterly unjustifiable.

"Lieut Morant seems to have been the primary mover in carrying out these orders, & Lieut Handcock willingly lent himself out as the principal executioner of them.

"Lieut Morant acquiesced in the illegal execution of the wounded Boer Visser & took a personal part in the massacre of the 8 surrendered Boers on 23 August.

"The two N.C.O.s acted under orders but were not justified in obeying illegal commands. After the murder of Van Buuren the officers seem to have exercised a reign of terror in the District, which hindered their men from reporting their illegal acts & even prevented their objecting to assist in the crime."

== Trial ==
According to Dr. C.A.R. Schulenberg, the first court-martial opened on 16 January 1902, with Lt.-Col. H.C. Denny presiding with six additional judges. Maj. James Francis Thomas of the New South Wales Mounted Rifles had already agreed to defend BVC Major Robert Lenehan. Maj. Thomas agreed, however, the night before the first trial, to defend all six defendants. The court sat in secret, contrary to regulations that all courts-martial were to be open to civilians, the military, and the press. The trial of Alfred Taylor was saved for last. South African historian Andries Pretorius believes that Crown Prosecutors were trying to force Lieuts. Morant, Handcock, Witton, and Picton to turn king's evidence against Taylor. If so, they were unsuccessful.

In what was dubbed, The Six Boers Incident, Taylor was put on trial for ordering the Valdezia Massacre. Former Bushveldt Carbineers Captain James Robertson and other perpetrators testified against him. As Taylor had resigned his commission upon his arrest three months earlier, he was tried as a civilian subject to service discipline by a military court under martial law, rather than by a court martial under the Army Act. Following his acquittal, Taylor returned to his farm near Plumtree, in Southern Rhodesia. Meanwhile, Lieuts. Harry Morant and Peter Handcock were convicted of murder and executed by firing squad on the early morning of 27 February 1902. Lieut. George Witton was convicted of the same charge, but his death sentence was commuted to life imprisonment. Lieut. Harry Picton was convicted of manslaughter and sentenced to be cashiered.

According to Dr. C.A.R. Schulenberg, all those involved in the massacre, "from Taylor right down to the Troopers who did the actual killing, were exonerated while Australians who were involved in similar episodes were court-martialed and executed. This was the first in a series of episodes which upset the Australian Government and its people; it led to a deep dissatisfaction and distrust, to say the least, of Kitchener and the British Army, which has not been fully erased to this day. There is in fact proof of numerous other incidents where unarmed Boers were shot by the British, about which nothing was said or done."

An urban legend later circulated in South Africa to the effect that, after Taylor's acquittal and return to Rhodesia, he was fatally shot in a saloon by the brother of Trooper B. J. van Buuren, whose murder Taylor had ordered. In reality, there was no truth to this. Taylor was recalled to active service during the First World War and served in France between 1917 and 1918. He later wrote that he had a "knee cap knocked out" on the Western Front (France/Belgium)."

== Personal life ==
Captain Taylor married Mrs. Phoebe Clark Wolfenden, the widow of a British trader, in an Anglican ceremony at Shoshong, Protectorate of Bechuanaland, on 12 September 1887. In a memoir written for the book First Steps in Civilizing Rhodesia, Mrs. Taylor described herself as being of mixed British and Bechuana descent. She further claimed to be the great-grandniece of King Sekgoma II. Despite Phoebe Taylor's descent from royalty, Captain de Bertodano dismissively referred to her as "a native or half-caste woman" and alleged that Captain Taylor's interracial marriage contributed to his bad reputation among the White population of Rhodesia. (see Racism in Zimbabwe)

Captain and Mrs. Taylor had eight children; Mrs. Maude Lindebloom, Mrs. Nora Davies, Adie Taylor, Alfred Taylor Jr., Freddy Taylor, Claud Taylor, Albert Taylor, and Charles Taylor. Accounts by Captain Taylor's family describe him as a "loving, caring husband and father".

== Death and legacy ==
Alfred Taylor died of cholecystitis and pneumonia at Bulawayo Memorial Hospital on 24 October 1941. On 31 October 1941 a brief obituary in the Rhodesian Herald described him as one of Rhodesia's "pioneers." According to South African historian Arthur Davey, "If Taylor enriched himself through the acquisition of Boer cattle, his lasting prosperity was not ensured by it. The National Archives, Harare, has correspondence that points to his having sought financial assistance from the Government later in his life. When he died in 1941 the estate that he left was not that of a wealthy farmer." Captain Alfred Taylor was buried at Bulawayo General Cemetery.

In a handwritten account of his military service, Captain Taylor claimed to have been awarded "the Matabele Medal" in 1893, the Queen's and King's South Africa Medals with 5 Bars for serving in the Second Boer War, and the Victory Medal for his service in World War I. In the region of South Africa where his crimes took place, Capt. Taylor's wartime activities still haunt the descendants of his victims more than a century later and his acquittal is locally reviled as a miscarriage of justice. According to South African historian Charles Leach, "In the opinion of many South Africans, particularly descendants of victims as well as other involved persons in the far Northern Transvaal, justice was only partially achieved by the trial and the resultant sentences. The feeling still prevails that not all the guilty parties were dealt with – the notorious Captain Taylor being the most obvious one of all."

Taylor is also detested in Australia, where his co-defendants, BVC Lieuts. Harry Morant and Peter Handcock, are widely seen as national icons and martyrs. Among Australians seeking to reopen the case, Taylor is often blamed for the atrocities that sent Lieuts. Morant and Handcock before a firing squad. Despite the seriousness of the evidence and charges against them, some modern Australians regard Morant and Handcock as scapegoats or even as the victims of judicial murder. They continue to attempt, with some public support, to obtain a posthumous pardon or even a new trial. In the 1980 Australian film Breaker Morant, Capt. Taylor is played by actor John Waters. In a 2013 review of the film, Graham Daeseler wrote: "The actual Taylor was a ruthless murderer, using the war as an excuse to plunder Boer property and line his own pockets. In the film, he is the defendants' only ostensible ally besides their attorney. Take one look at Waters, though, with that pencil-thin scar on his cheek and that haughty, dead-eyed stare, and you’ll see a glimpse of the monster lurking beneath the gentleman’s façade." Captain Alfred Taylor was portrayed as a villain amongst the Australian troops fighting in the Gallipoli Campaign in the historical novel A Fatal Tide, Random House, 2014.

== See also ==
- John M. Chivington
- Léon Rom
- Lothar von Trotha
