= Criminal order =

Criminal order or criminal orders may refer to:

- Criminal order (international law), an order to commit a war crime or violate international law
- Criminal orders (Nazi Germany), orders to commit war crimes issued by the military of Nazi Germany
- Restraining order or protective order, also known as a criminal order

== See also ==
- Judicial murder, the intentional and premeditated killing of an innocent person by means of capital punishment
- Superior orders, a defense for war crimes
