= Breaker Morant (film) =

1980 film by Bruce Beresford

- Theatrical release poster
- Directed by: Bruce Beresford
- Screenplay by: Jonathan Hardy; David Stevens; Bruce Beresford
- Based on: Breaker Morant 1978 play by Kenneth Ross; The Breaker 1973 novel by Kit Denton
- Produced by: Matthew Carroll
- Starring: Edward Woodward; Jack Thompson; John Waters; Bryan Brown; Charles Tingwell; Terence Donovan; Ray Meagher; Lewis Fitz-Gerald; Rod Mullinar
- Cinematography: Donald McAlpine
- Edited by: William Anderson
- Production companies: South Australian Film Corporation; Australian Film Commission; The Seven Network; Pact Productions
- Distributed by: Roadshow Film Distributors
- Release date: 15 March 1980 (Australia)
- Running time: 107 minutes
- Country: Australia
- Languages: English; Afrikaans
- Budget: A$800,000
- Box office: $4.7 million (Australia) $3.5 million (US/Canada)

Breaker Morant is a 1980 Australian biographical war drama film directed by Bruce Beresford, who also co-wrote the screenplay based on Kenneth G. Ross's 1978 play of the same name. It stars Edward Woodward as the title character, Lt. Harry Harbord "Breaker" Morant, along with Jack Thompson, John Waters, and Bryan Brown.

The film concerns the 1902 court martial of lieutenants Morant, Peter Handcock and George Witton—one of the first war crime prosecutions in British military history. Australians serving in the British Army during the Second Anglo-Boer War, Morant, Handcock, and Witton stood accused of murdering captured enemy combatants and an unarmed civilian in the Northern Transvaal. The film is notable for its exploration of the Nuremberg Defence, the politics of the death penalty and the human cost of total war. As the trial unfolds, the events in question are shown in flashbacks.

The film won ten 1980 Australian Film Institute Awards including: Best Film, Best Direction, Best Screenplay, Best Leading Actor (for Jack Thompson) and Best Supporting Actor (Bryan Brown). It was also nominated for an Academy Award for the Best Adapted Screenplay.

Breaker Morant remains the movie with which Beresford is most identified and has "hoisted the images of the accused officers to the level of Australian icons and martyrs". In a 1999 interview Beresford said Breaker Morant "never pretended for a moment" that the defendants were not guilty as charged. He had intended the film to explore how wartime atrocities can be "committed by people who appear to be quite normal". Beresford concluded that he was "amazed" that so many people see his film as being about "poor Australians who were framed by the Brits".

== Plot ==
In 1902, three Australian soldiers are tried for war crimes committed during the Second Boer War in South Africa. Lieutenants Harry "Breaker" Morant, Peter Handcock and George Witton; all officers of the elite Bushveldt Carbineers, are charged with the murder of one Boer prisoner (Floris Visser), the subsequent murders of six more; Morant and Handcock are accused of the sniper-style death of a German missionary, the Rev. Hesse. Their counsel, Major Thomas, has had only one day to prepare their defence.

Lord Kitchener, who ordered the trial, hopes to bring the Boer War to an end with a peace conference. To that end, he uses the Morant trial to show that he is willing to judge his own soldiers harshly if they disobey the rules of war. Though there are great complexities associated with charging active-duty soldiers with murder, Kitchener is determined to have a guilty verdict, and the chief of the court supports him.

The causes and occurrences relating to the trial are developed. Morant's execution of the Boer prisoners was revenge for the mutilation and death of his friend and commanding officer, Captain Hunt. Angered by the incident, Morant led an attack on a Boer camp, where a Boer wearing Hunt's khaki jacket was captured. Morant had him executed.

The killing of six prisoners was in much the same fashion. Morant later justifies their deaths, saying, "You know the orders from Whitehall. If they show a white flag, we don't see it. I didn't see it." Before their execution, Morant notices Hesse speaking with the prisoners. Morant, furious, is convinced that Hesse is a spy, though he has no proof. A conversation with Handcock leads to the latter taking a rifle and horse and following Hesse, who is found shot the next morning.

During the trial, the court's bias toward a guilty verdict becomes apparent, as well as the political machinations behind it. The focus is on whether or not orders were issued by Kitchener to shoot all Boer prisoners; Thomas' case is that there were standing, though unwritten, orders to do so. Since these were verbally relayed to Hunt, and by Hunt to Morant, there is no way to prove that the orders existed.

Ironically, it transpires that while Morant acted under orders by shooting the prisoners, he and Handcock were in fact responsible for the murder of Hesse. Handcock, who took care to set up an alibi with two "ladyfriends," admits to Witton that he actually followed Hesse and shot him. However, the court acquits them of the murder of Hesse but finds them guilty of the other two charges.

Kitchener is conveniently absent and therefore unavailable for pleas for a reprieve, though he does commute Witton's sentence to life imprisonment before leaving. Morant and Handcock are shot in the morning as Witton is taken to the prison transport. As a final insult Handcock's coffin is built too small for his tall frame, and the soldiers are forced to clumsily cram his body in.

Epilogue: Thomas returns to his native Australia and continues his law practice in Tenterfield, New South Wales, which is otherwise confined to estate planning and wills. Taylor took a senior administrative position, staying in the Transvaal. Witton only serves three years at HM Prison Lewes, England, after which he returns to Australia and writes the book, Scapegoats of the Empire.

== Cast ==
- Edward Woodward as Lt. Harry "Breaker" Morant
- Jack Thompson as Maj. James Francis Thomas
- John Waters as Capt. Alfred Taylor
- Bryan Brown as Lt. Peter Handcock
- Charles Tingwell as Lt. Col. H.C. Denny
- Terence Donovan as Capt. Simon Hunt
- Chris Haywood as Cpl. Sharp
- Vincent Ball as Col. Hamilton
- Ray Meagher as SMG. Drummond
- Alan Cassell as Lord Kitchener
- Russell Kiefel as Christiaan Botha
- Rob Steele as Capt. Robertson
- Lewis Fitz-Gerald as Lt. George Ramsdale Witton
- Rod Mullinar as Maj. Charles Bolton
- Frank Wilson as Dr. Johnson

== Production ==
Funding came from the SAFC, the Australian Film Commission, the Seven Network and PACT Productions. The distributors, Roadshow, insisted that Jack Thompson be given a role. The movie was the second of two films Beresford intended to make for the South Australian Film Corporation. He wanted to make Breakout, about the Cowra Breakout but could not find a script with which he was satisfied, so he turned to the story of Breaker Morant.

Jack Thompson was originally to play the role of Lt Hancock with John Hargreaves to play the defending lawyer, but Hargreaves had to drop out.

== Historical accuracy ==
=== Alleged German pressure ===
In conversation with Bolton, Lord Kitchener states that Kaiser Wilhelm II has formally protested about the murder of Hesse, whom he describes as a German citizen. He says that the German people support the Boer cause, that their government covets the gold and diamond mines of the Boer Republics, and that the British Government fears German entry into the war. This, Kitchener explains, is why Morant, Handcock, and Witton must be convicted at all costs.

According to the South African historian Charles Leach, the legend that the German Foreign Office protested about the murder of Hesse "cannot be proved through official channels". "No personal or direct communication" between the Kaiser and his uncle, King Edward VII, "has been found despite widespread legend that this was definitely the case". Questions raised in the House of Commons on 8 April 1902 were answered by an insistence that the War Office, the Foreign Office, or Lord Kitchener had not received "any such communication on this subject" "on behalf of the German government".

Under international law, the German government had no grounds to protest. Despite being attached to the Berlin Missionary Society, Hesse had been born in Cape Colony and "was, technically speaking, a British subject, and not a German citizen". Yet, the scene contains a kernel of truth. Leach writes, "Several eminent South African historians, local enthusiasts, and commentators share the opinion that had it not been for the murder of Hesse, none of the other Bushveldt Carbineers would have been brought to trial".

=== Three defendants ===
Although only Morant, Handcock, and Witton are shown as being on trial, there were three other defendants:

- Lieutenant Henry Picton, a British-born Australian officer of the Bushveldt Carbineers, was charged along with Morant, Handcock, and Witton of "committing the offense of murder" for delivering a coup de grâce after the execution of the wounded prisoner Floris Visser. Picton was found guilty of manslaughter and sentenced to be cashiered from the British Armed Forces.
- Captain Alfred James Taylor, the Anglo-Irish commander of military intelligence at Fort Edward, stood accused of the murder of six unarmed Afrikaner men and boys, the theft of their money and livestock, and the subsequent murder of a Bushveldt Carbineers Trooper. He was acquitted.
- Major Robert Lenehan, the Australian Field Commander of the Bushveldt Carbineers, who stood accused of concealing the murder of a Bushveldt Carbineers Trooper who had disapproved of shooting prisoners. The official charge was "When on active service by culpable neglect failing to make a report which it was duty to make". Lenehan was found guilty and sentenced to a reprimand.

=== Role of other ranks and Colonel Hall ===
The soldiers from the Fort Edward garrison who testify against Morant, Handcock and Witton are depicted as motivated by grudges against their former officers. A prime example is Corporal Sharp, who expresses a willingness to walk across South Africa to serve in the defendants' firing squad. Other prosecution witnesses have been thrown out of the Bushveldt Carbineers by the defendants for looting, drunkenness and other offences. All are portrayed with British accents.

Hall, the officer commanding at Pietersburg, is depicted as fully aware and even complicit in the total war tactics of the Fort Edward garrison. He is also described as having been sent to India to prevent him from giving testimony favourable to the defence. Surviving documents tell that the arrest of the six defendants was ordered by Hall after a letter from the other ranks at Fort Edward. The letter, dated 4 October 1901, was written by BVC Trooper Robert Mitchell Cochrane, a former justice of the peace from Western Australia and signed by 15 members of the Fort Edward garrison.

After listing numerous murders and attempted murders of unarmed Boer prisoners, local civilians and BVC personnel who disapproved, the letter concluded, "Sir, many of us are Australians who have fought throughout nearly the whole war while others are Afrikaners who have fought from Colenso till now. We cannot return home with the stigma of these crimes attached to our names. Therefore we humbly pray that a full and exhaustive inquiry be made by Imperial officers in order that the truth be elicited and justice done. Also we beg that all witnesses may be kept in camp at Pietersburg till the inquiry is finished. So deeply do we deplore the opprobrium which must be inseparably attached to these crimes that scarcely a man once his time is up can be prevailed to re-enlist in this corps. Trusting for the credit of thinking you will grant the inquiry we seek".

=== Arrest at Fort Edward ===
During his conversation with Handcock and Witton in the prison courtyard, Morant alleges that the British Army has marked them for death "ever since they arrested us at Fort Edward" but their arrests took place elsewhere. After the letter Hall summoned all Fort Edward officers and non-commissioned officers to Pietersburg on 21 October 1901. All were met by a party of mounted infantry five miles outside Pietersburg on the morning of 23 October 1901 and "brought into town like criminals". Morant was arrested after returning from leave in Pretoria, where he had gone to settle the affairs of his deceased friend Captain Hunt.

=== Rejection of deals for leniency ===
In the film, the British military is determined to kill the defendants. According to the Australian historians Margaret Carnegie and Frank Shields, Morant and Handcock rejected an offer of immunity from prosecution in return for turning king's evidence. Military prosecutors allegedly hoped to use them as witnesses against BVC Major Robert Lenehan, who was believed to have issued orders to take no prisoners. Towards the end of the film, Taylor informs Morant that the British Army will never dare to prosecute him, as he really can implicate Kitchener in war crimes. According to the South African historian Andries Pretorius, the trial of Alfred Taylor was almost certainly saved for the last because "The prosecution must have been hoping", in vain for the accused officers, "to implicate Taylor". Their refusal to do so seems to have ensured that Taylor was not convicted at his trial.

=== Captain Hunt ===
In the film, Hunt is inaccurately depicted as having an Australian accent. According to the South African historian Charles Leach, Captain Hunt "was an Englishman, a former Lieutenant in Kitchener's Fighting Scouts, and a fine horseman". A surviving photograph of Hunt also reveals that he was far younger than the actor who plays him on screen. The real Hunt's first name was Percy, while the character in the film is called 'Simon'.

=== Witton's death date ===
The movie states that Witton died in 1943. In reality, he died of complications after suffering a heart attack on 14 August 1942.

== Reception ==
=== Critical response ===
Rotten Tomatoes gave Breaker Morant a 100% approval rating, based on 22 reviews, with an average score of 8.5/10.

The film also stirred debate on the legacy of the trial with its pacifist theme. D. L. Kershen wrote "Breaker Morant tells the story of the court martial of Harry Morant, Peter Handcock, and George Witton in South Africa in 1902. Yet, its overriding theme is that "war is evil". Breaker Morant is a beautiful antiwar statement – a plea for the end of the intrigues and crimes that war entails".

Bruce Beresford claimed the film is often misunderstood as the story of men railroaded by the British,

But that's not what it's about at all. The film never pretended for a moment that they weren't guilty. It said they were guilty. But what was interesting about it was that it analysed why men in this situation would behave as they had never behaved before in their lives. It's the pressures that are put to bear on people in war time ... Look at all the things that happen in these countries committed by people who appear to be quite normal. That was what I was interested in examining. I always get amazed when people say to me that this is a film about poor Australians who were framed by the Brits.

The film was released in the US by New World Pictures.

After the success of Breaker Morant, Beresford was offered dozens of Hollywood scripts including Tender Mercies, which he later directed. The 1983 film earned him his only Academy Award nomination for Best Director to date, even though Driving Miss Daisy (1989) which he directed, won Best Picture. Beresford said that Breaker Morant was not that successful commercially,

Critically, it was important, which is a key factor, and it has kept being shown over the years. Whenever I am in Los Angeles, it's always on TV. I get phone calls from people who say, 'I saw your movie, could you do something for us?' But, they're looking at a [then] twenty-year-old movie. At the time it never had an audience. Nobody went anywhere in the world. It opened and closed in America in less than a week. And in London, I remember it had four days in the West End. Commercially, a disaster, but ... It's a film that people talk about to me all the time.

The film ignited Jack Thompson's international career.

=== Box office ===
Breaker Morant grossed A$4,735,000 at the box office in Australia, the equivalent of $19.7 million in 2017 dollars.

=== Awards and nominations ===
Award	Category	Subject	Result
AACTA Award (1980 AFI Awards)	Best Film	Matt Carroll	Won
AACTA Award (1980 AFI Awards)	Best Direction	Bruce Beresford	Won
AACTA Award (1980 AFI Awards)	Best Screenplay, Original or Adapted	Jonathan Hardy, David Stevens, Bruce Beresford	Won
AACTA Award (1980 AFI Awards)	Best Actor	Jack Thompson	Won
AACTA Award (1980 AFI Awards)	Best Actor	Edward Woodward	Nominated
AACTA Award (1980 AFI Awards)	Best Supporting Actor	Lewis Fitz-Gerald	Nominated
AACTA Award (1980 AFI Awards)	Best Supporting Actor	Bryan Brown	Won
AACTA Award (1980 AFI Awards)	Best Supporting Actor	Charles 'Bud' Tingwell	Nominated
AACTA Award (1980 AFI Awards)	Best Cinematography	Donald McAlpine	Won
AACTA Award (1980 AFI Awards)	Best Costume Design	Anna Senior	Won
AACTA Award (1980 AFI Awards)	Best Editing	William M. Anderson	Won
AACTA Award (1980 AFI Awards)	Best Production Design	David Copping	Won
AACTA Award (1980 AFI Awards)	Best Sound	William Anderson, Jeanine Chiavlo, Phil Judd, Gary Wilkins	Won
Academy Award	Best Adapted Screenplay	Jonathan Hardy, David Stevens, Bruce Beresford	Nominated
Cannes Film Festival	Palme d'Or	Bruce Beresford	Nominated
Cannes Film Festival	Best Supporting Actor	Jack Thompson	Won
Golden Globe Award	Best Foreign Film		Nominated
Kansas City Film Critics Circle	Best Foreign Film		Won
NBR Award	Top 10 Films		Won
NYFCC Award	Best Foreign Language Film		2nd place

== Soundtrack ==
A soundtrack was released by Cherry Pie Music (CPF 1046)

=== Charts ===
Chart (1982)	Peak position
Australia (Kent Music Report)	87

== Home media ==
A DVD was released by REEL Corporation in 2001 with a running time of 104 minutes. Image Entertainment released a Blu-ray Disc version of the film in the US on 5 February 2008 (107 minutes), including the documentary "The Boer War", a detailed account of the historical facts depicted in the film. In 2015 the film was released by The Criterion Collection on both DVD and Blu-ray.

== See also ==
- British war crimes
- Court martial of Breaker Morant – 1902 prosecution of six British Army soldiers for crimes during the Second Boer War
- Trial movies – Legal drama film centered on a trial
