= Robert Lenehan =

Australian army officer

VD Robert Lenehan
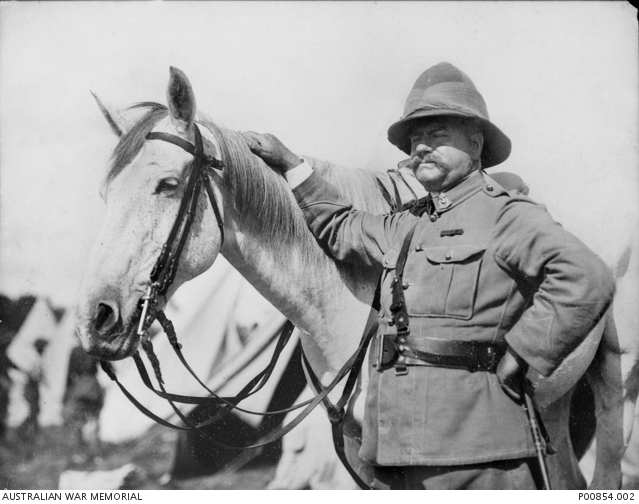
- Lenehan c. 1904
- Born: 16 August 1865; Petersham, Colony of New South Wales
- Died: 20 May 1922 (aged 56); Sydney, Australia
- Burial place: Field of Mars Cemetery, Ryde, New South Wales, Australia
- Education: Saint Ignatius' College, Riverview
- Military career
- Allegiance: British Empire; Australia
- Branch: Australian Army; Australian Army Reserve
- Rank: Lieutenant Colonel
- Nickname: Bob Lenehan
- Units: 1st Regiment New South Wales Force; New South Wales Artillery; New South Wales Mounted Rifles; Bushveldt Carbineers; Royal Australian Artillery; 4th Australian Field Artillery Brigade
- Commands: Bushveldt Carbineers
- Conflicts: Second Boer War; World War I
- Awards

Robert William Lenehan (16 August 1865 – 20 May 1922) was an Australian solicitor and military officer who commanded the Bushveldt Carbineers (BVC) during the Second Boer War. Lenehan was convicted of war crimes alongside Harry Morant, Peter Handcock, and George Witton, among others, for the murder of Boer prisoners of war. Lenehan was later pardoned by the Australian government for his role in commanding the Bushveldt Carbineers.

== Early life and education ==
Lenehan was born on 16 August 1865 in Petersham, New South Wales, he was the son of Christopher Henry Lenehan and Marie Louise. Lenehan attended Saint Ignatius' College, Riverview before being admitted as a solicitor in 1891.

== Early military service ==
Lenehan was commissioned as a Second Lieutenant in 1890 in the First Infantry Regiment of New South Wales Forces, a part-time military force of the Colony of New South Wales. He was transferred to the New South Wales Artillery in 1894 and promoted to the rank of Major in 1898. Lenehan volunteered to fight in the Second Boer War and joined the New South Wales Mounted Rifles as the Captain of "B" squadron.^{:62} During his service with the New South Wales Mounted Rifles Lenehan was awarded the Queen's South Africa Medal with six clasps.^{:58-59} Lenehan was later appointed by Lord Kitchener to command the Bushveldt Carbineers, a newly recruited irregular cavalry regiment raised to fight against Boer commandos during the guerrilla warfare phase of the Second Boer War.^{:58}^{:362}

=== Bushveldt Carbineers ===
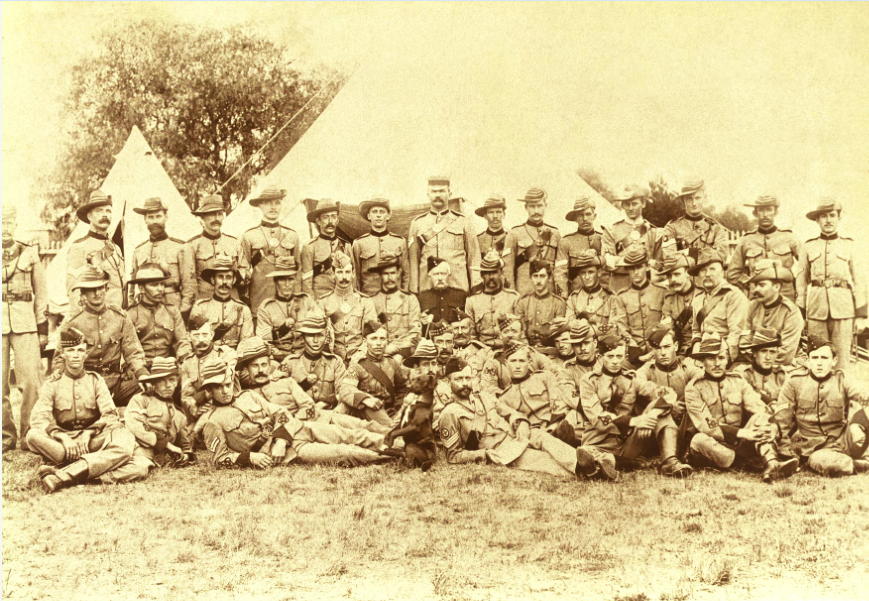
Lenehan (standing in the middle) with the Bushveldt Carbineers c. 1901-1902 during the Second Boer War

Recruiting for the Bushveldt Carbineers (BVC) began on 21 February 1901 in Durban. The regiment was made up of 320 volunteers, primarily Australian and other colonial personnel whose terms of service had expired.^{:362} The Carabiners first saw action in April 1901 around Pietersburg as part of General Herbert Plumer's 1,300-man column in the Northern Transvaal near the border of Portuguese Mozambique.^{:362} The BVC became well-known for their use of unconventional warfare tactics and lack of discipline. Despite their lack of discipline, the BVC managed to capture a significant number of Boer guerillas.

While Lenehan was the de jure commander of the BVC, George Witton states in his book Scapegoats of the Empire that Lenehan's command was "in name only".^{:45} While at Fort Edward in the Northern Transvaal the BVC was under the de facto command of Captain's Alfred Taylor and James H. Robertson.^{:45} Percy Frederick Hunt would succeed Robertson as the primary commander of the BVC but was later killed in a Boer ambush on 6 August 1901. Lieutenant Harry Morant, one of Hunt's subordinate officers at Fort Edward, later engaged in a series of revenge killings for the death of hunt including shooting several Boer prisoners and later a German missionary, these actions would ultimately lead to a court of inquiry along with Morant's court-martial.

=== Court Martial ===
Lenehan was court-martialed alongside Morant, Handcock, Witton, and Lieutenant Henry Picton for their role in the shooting of Boer prisoners.^{:372} While Morant and Handcock were found guilty for the shooting of prisoners and a German missionary, Lenehan was primarily reprimanded for dereliction of duty as the BVC's commanding officer and fort not reporting the shootings.^{:371} Lenehan was court-martialed for two offenses; failing to report the shooting of an Afrikaner member of BVC and for the shooting of three Boer prisoners.^{:371} Lenehan was only found guilty of the first charge and was immediately removed of his command while the BVC was disbanded.^{:49} Lenehan was imprisoned in Cape Town until being deported back to Australia in February 1903.

== Later career ==
Following Lenehan's removal from South Africa to Australia he continued to work in the field of law as a solicitor, however, he was deprived of a soldier's pension by the War Office and transferred to the Australian Army Reserve. Lenehan was later restored to his original rank and transferred back to active service. Lenehan later sought to have his name exonerated and in 1904 an Australian military tribunal cleared Lenehan for his role in the Bushveldt Carbineers. During World War I Lenehan served as a training officer for the 4th Australian Field Artillery Brigade. Lenehan later served as the commandant of Menagle Light Horse Camp which trained Australian troops of the Australian Light Horse. Following Lenehan's role as a solicitor in a controversial divorce case in Sydney, Defense Minister George Pearce removed Lenehan from his command at Menagle Camp, Lenehan retired from the military on 20 August 1918.

== Death ==
Lenehan died of cirrhosis on 20 May 1922 in Sydney. He is buried at the Field of Mars Cemetery in Ryde, New South Wales. Lenehan's name is listed on the Boer War Memorial at Kitchener Park in Gunnedah.

== Personal life ==
Lenehan married Harriett Emma Mary Hodge on 30 January 1889 while attending college at Saint Ignatius.
