= War crimes trial =

Type of trial under international law

A war crimes trial is the trial of persons charged with criminal violation of the laws and customs of war and related principles of international law committed during armed conflict.

== History ==
The trial of Peter von Hagenbach by an ad hoc tribunal of the Holy Roman Empire in 1474, was the first "international" war crimes trials and also of command responsibility. Hagenbach was put on trial for atrocities committed during the occupation of Breisach, found guilty, and beheaded. Since he was convicted for crimes, "he as a knight was deemed to have a duty to prevent", although Hagenbach defended himself by arguing that he was only following orders from the Duke of Burgundy, Charles the Bold, to whom the Holy Roman Empire had given Breisach.

== 19th century ==
In 1865, Henry Wirz, a Confederate officer, was held accountable and hanged for appalling conditions at Andersonville Prison where many Union soldiers died during the American Civil War.

During the Second Boer War, the British Army court-martialed Breaker Morant, Peter Handcock, Alfred Taylor, and several other officers for multiple murders of POWs and many civilian noncombatants in the Northern Transvaal (see Court-martial of Breaker Morant).

== 20th century ==
=== Trials of World War I crimes ===
After World War I, a small number of German personnel were tried by a German court in the Leipzig War Crimes Trials for crimes allegedly committed during that war.

Article 227 of the Treaty of Versailles, the peace treaty between Germany and the Allied Powers after the First World War, "publicly arraign[ed] Wilhelm von Hohenzollern, formerly German Emperor, for a supreme offence against international morality and the sanctity of treaties." The former Kaiser had escaped to the Netherlands, however, and despite demands for his extradition having been made, the Dutch refused to surrender him, and he was not brought to trial. Germany, as a signatory to the treaty, thus was placed on notice as to what might occur in the event of a subsequent war.

=== Trials of World War II crimes ===
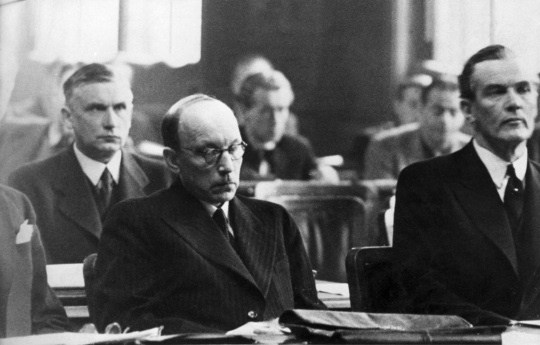
After the Continuation War in Finland, Risto Ryti (in the middle), the 5th President of the Republic of Finland, was the main defendant in the Finnish War-responsibility trials. Ryti was sentenced to 10 years imprisonment.

After World War II, the phrase referred usually to the trials of German and Japanese leaders in courts established by the victorious Allied nations.

The former trials were held in Nuremberg, Germany, under the authority of two legal instruments. One, the London Charter was signed by representatives of the United States, United Kingdom, France, and the Soviet Union in London on August 8, 1945; the other, Law No. 10, was promulgated by the Allied Control Council in Berlin on December 20, 1945.

The London Charter provided for the establishment of the International Military Tribunal, composed of one judge and one alternate judge from each of the signatory nations, to try war criminals. Under the London Charter, the crimes charged against defendants fell into three categories: crimes against peace (crimes involving the planning, initiating, and waging a war of aggression); war crimes (violations of the laws and customs of war as embodied in the Hague Conventions and generally recognized by military forces of civilized nations); and crimes against humanity, such as the extermination of racial, ethnic, and religious groups and other such atrocities against civilians.

On October 8, 1945, Anton Dostler was the first German general to be tried for war crimes by a U.S. military tribunal at the Palace Of Justice in Rome. He was accused of ordering the killing of 15 captured U.S. soldiers of Operation Ginny II in Italy in March 1944. He admitted ordering the execution, but stated that he could not be held responsible, as he had just been following orders from his superiors. The execution of 15 U.S. prisoners of war in Italy ordered by Dostler was an implementation of Hitler's Commando Order of 1942 which required the immediate execution of all Allied commandos, whether in proper uniforms or not, without trial if apprehended by German forces. The tribunal rejected the defense of Superior Orders and found Dostler guilty of war crimes. He was sentenced to death and executed by a firing squad on December 1, 1945, in Aversa.

The Dostler case became precedent for the Nuremberg trials of German generals, officials, and Nazi leaders, beginning in November 1945, that the use of Superior orders as a defense did not relieve officers from responsibility of carrying out illegal orders or the liability of being punished in court. This principle was codified in Principle IV of the Nuremberg Principles and similar principles were found in sections of the Universal Declaration of Human Rights.

The trials for the Japanese war criminals were established in Tokyo, Japan, to implement the Cairo Declaration, the Potsdam Declaration, the Instrument of Surrender, and the Moscow Conference. The Potsdam Declaration (July 1945) had stated, "stern justice shall be meted out to all war criminals, including those who have visited cruelties upon our prisoners", though it did not specifically foreshadow trials. The terms of reference for the Tribunal were set out in the IMTFE Charter, issued on January 19, 1946. There was major disagreement, both among the Allies and within their administrations, about whom to try and how to try them. Despite the lack of consensus, General Douglas MacArthur, the Supreme Commander of the Allied Powers, decided to initiate arrests. On September 11, a week after the surrender, he ordered the arrest of 39 suspects—most of them members of Prime Minister Hideki Tojo's war cabinet. Tojo tried to commit suicide, but was resuscitated with the help of U.S. doctors. He was later found guilty among others, and hanged.

==== Nuremberg trials ====
On October 18, 1945, the chief prosecutors lodged an indictment with the tribunal charging 24 individuals with a variety of crimes and atrocities, including the deliberate instigation of aggressive wars, extermination of racial and religious groups, murder and mistreatment of prisoners of war, and the murder, mistreatment, and deportation of hundreds of thousands of inhabitants of countries occupied by Germany during the war.

Among the accused were the Nationalist Socialist leaders Hermann Göring and Rudolf Hess, the diplomat Joachim von Ribbentrop, the munitions maker Gustav Krupp von Bohlen und Halbach, Marshal Wilhelm Keitel, Grand Admiral Erich Raeder and 18 other military leaders and civilian officials. Seven organizations that formed part of the basic structure of the Nazi government were also charged as criminal. These organizations included the SS (Schutzstaffel, 'Defense Corps'), the Gestapo (Geheime Staatspolizei, 'Secret State Police'), and the SA (Sturmabteilung, 'Storm Troops'), as well as the General Staff and High Command of the German armed forces.

The trial began on November 20, 1945. Much of the evidence submitted by the prosecution consisted of original military, diplomatic, and other government documents that fell into the hands of the Allied forces after the collapse of the German government.

The judgment of the International Military Tribunal was handed down on September 30 and October 1, 1946. Among notable features of the decision was the conclusion, in accordance with the London Agreement, that to plan or instigate an aggressive war is a crime under the principles of international law. The tribunal rejected the contention of the defense that such acts had not previously been defined as crimes under international law and that therefore the condemnation of the defendants would violate the principle of justice prohibiting ex post facto punishments. As with the Dostler case, it also rejected the contention of a number of the defendants that they were not legally responsible for their acts because they performed the acts under the orders of superior authority, stating that "the true test . . . is not the existence of the order but whether moral choice (in executing it) was in fact possible."

With respect to war crimes and crimes against humanity, the tribunal found overwhelming evidence of a systematic rule of violence, brutality, and terrorism by the German government in the territories occupied by its forces. Millions of persons were murdered in Nazi concentration camps, many of which were equipped with gas chambers for the extermination of Jews, Gypsies, and members of other ethnic or religious groups. Under the slave labor policy of the German government, at least 5 million persons had been forcibly deported from their homes to Germany. Many of them died because of inhumane treatment. The tribunal also found that atrocities had been committed on a large scale and as a matter of official policy.

Of the seven indicted organizations, the tribunal declared criminal the Leadership Corps of the party, the SS, the SD (Sicherheitsdienst, 'Security Service'), and the Gestapo.

== Ad hoc tribunals ==
In May 1993, during the Yugoslav Wars following the massive war crimes, and acts of "ethnic cleansing" in the former Yugoslavia by Bosnian-Serb forces, the United Nations established the International Criminal Tribunal for the Former Yugoslavia, to try war criminals of all nationalities. The crimes indicted included grave breaches of the Geneva Conventions, war crimes, crimes against humanity, and genocide; it was the first tribunal in which sexual assault was prosecuted as a war crime. The ICTY was the first international war crimes tribunal since the Nuremberg Trials. Ultimately, nearly 161 individuals were indicted in the ICTY: 68% of Serb ethnicity. Croatian-Serb, Bosnian-Serb, Serbian, and Bosnian-Croat officials were convicted of crimes against humanity, and Bosnian-Serb leaders of genocide.

In 1994, the UN opened the International Criminal Tribunal for Rwanda following the April–June genocide in that country of Hutu nationals.

The tribunals, while effective in prosecution of individuals, proved to be a costly venture, and exposed the need for a permanent tribunal, which was eventually known as the International Criminal Court.

== See also ==
- United Nations War Crimes Commission
- Harry Breaker Morant and Court martial of Breaker Morant
- My Lai Massacre

== Bibliography ==
- Bloxham, Donald; Waterlow, Jonathan (2015). "War crimes trials". In Bosworth, Richard; Maiolo, Joseph (eds.). The Cambridge History of the Second World War. Cambridge: Cambridge University Press. pp. 181–208. doi:10.1017/CHO9781139524377.011.
