= Percy Frederick Hunt =

British Army officer killed in the Boer War (1873-1901)

Captain Percy Frederic Hunt
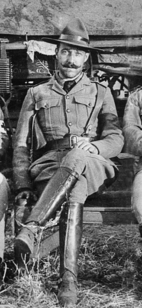
- Hunt c. 1901
- Born: 28 May 1873; Pau, France
- Died: 6 August 1901 (aged 28); Duiwelskloof, Northern Transvaal, South African Republic
- Military career
- Service years: 1893–1901
- Rank: Captain
- Unit: Bushveldt Carbineers

Captain Percy Frederic Hunt (28 May 1873 – 6 August 1901) was French-born, British army officer who was killed in action by the Letaba Commando at Duivelskloof during the Second Boer War. After Hunt's death, his subordinate and close friend, Lt. Harry Morant, responded with a series of revenge killings of both POWs and many local civilians. This led directly to the court-martial of Breaker Morant, one of the first war crimes prosecutions in British military history.

== Early life ==
Hunt was born on 28 May 1873 in Pau, France. He joined the British Army on 2 July 1894 and received a commission in the York and Lancaster Regiment. On 9 December 1894, he transferred to the 13th Hussars as a 2nd Lieutenant. Less than two years later, Hunt resigned his Commission.

According to South African historian Arthur Davey, "During the South African War his service was with irregular units, in his first tour of duty with French's Scouts. After the occupation of Pretoria in June 1900 he was one of several officers on the staff of the Military Governor who undertook civil duties, his own assignment being that of a marriage officer. After a holiday in England he returned to the war theatre and was re-engaged in the newly established South African Mounted Irregular Force. With effect on 16 June 1901 he was promoted to a captaincy in the BVC."

== Friendship with Harry Morant ==
Hunt and Morant are likely to have met in Pretoria sometime between July–November 1900, just after Morant's service in the South Australian Mounted Rifles had been completed. They developed a friendship over time, and eventually Hunt invited Morant to join the recently formed, Bushveldt Carbineers in April 1901.

== Death ==
=== Prelude ===
At the end of July 1901, the garrison at Fort Edward received a visit from the Reverend Fritz Reuter of the Berlin Missionary Society and his family. Rev. Reuter was assigned to the Medingen Mission Station and, despite later claims by his family, he "seems to have been an exception" to the generally Republican sympathies "of the Zoutpansberg German population". In conversation with Captain Hunt, Rev. Reuter reported that Field cornet Barend Viljoen's Letaba Commando was present at Duivelskloof and had been "harassing local noncombatant farmers". Rev. Reuter further alleged that his own mission station had been threatened. In response, Captain Hunt ordered a detachment under BVC Sergeant A.B.C. Cecil to protect the missionary and his family on their return journey.

After Rev. Reuter's intelligence had been confirmed by a Native runner, Captain Hunt also learned that Sergeant Cecil's patrol had been ambushed near the Medingen Mission Station. In response, the captain departed Fort Edward on 2 August 1901 with the intention of ambushing the Viljoen Commando. In addition to service personnel of the Bushveldt Carbineers, the patrol included Tony Schiel, a defector from the Zoutpansberg Commando and Intelligence Scout for Captain Alfred Taylor.

It was to be Schiel's task to command between 300 and 400 irregulars drawn from the local Lobedu people. According to South African historian Charles Leach, Captain Hunt had received "warnings and expressions of caution" regarding "the wisdom of attacking an enemy position at night" without normal reconnaissance of the place. Deciding to proceed anyway, Captain Hunt led "his patrol into a situation that would echo through the next 100 years."

=== Ambush ===
According to the diary of BVC Trooper J.S. Silke, Rev. Reuter warned Captain Hunt against attacking. The Viljoen farmhouse, he explained, was built on a rocky hillside and "was unassailable". Furthermore, the nearby Botha farmhouse contained more than 40 armed men who could easily cut off the Bushveldt Carbineers' line of retreat. Despite the missionary's warnings and the fact that it was a bright moonlit night, Captain Hunt chose to attack anyway.

After planning a two-pronged attack, Captain Hunt ordered Trooper Silke to wait for a signal shot and rush the farmhouse from behind with 50 Lobedu warriors. Then, Captain Hunt approached the farmhouse via the concrete steps terraced into the hillside.

According to the memoirs of Hendrik Adriaan Jacobs, the Viljoen Commando knew that an attack was coming. The Commando's members, however, were "feverish" from the effects of malaria and fatalistically waited for the arrival of the Bushveldt Carbineers. Jacobs later recalled how he saw Hunt's party through a window and began shooting. Possibly mistaking Jacobs' first shot for the signal, the BVC and the Lobedu also began shooting and general pandemonium ensued. In an exchange of fire, Captain Hunt was shot through the chest. Anglo-African Bushveldt Carbineers Sergeant Frank Eland was killed while attempting to go to Hunt's aid, as was at least one Lobedu warrior. On the Boer side, Barend Viljoen, his brother J.J. Viljoen, and G. Hartzenberg were killed. The dead of both sides were left behind by their retreating comrades.

=== Aftermath ===
When the surviving members of the patrol returned to Medingen Mission Station, Rev. Reuter asked them about their officers and "was told a confusing and contradictory story of what had happened". Decades later, Rev. Reuter's daughter recalled in a televised interview, "My father roused on them, asking how they could leave their Captain like that."

The body of Captain Hunt was later found stripped, with his neck broken, his face stomped on with a hobnailed boot, and with his legs slashed with a knife.

According to South African historian Charles Leach, however, Captain Hunt's broken neck would be consistent with a fall down the concrete steps after being shot in the chest. The mutilations found on his body were also found on the bodies of the three dead Boers. Both sides blamed the other for the disfigurement of the dead. Viljoen Commando member Hendrik Jacobs, however, believed that Lobedu witch-doctors were to blame. According to historian Charles Leach, accounts by French anthropologist Henri Junod reveal that the traditional practice of the Lobedu people was to disembowel dead and dying warriors on the battlefield in order to set their spirits free.

The body of Captain Percy Hunt was buried at the Medingen Mission Station, after a burial service was read over his body by Rev. Fritz Reuter. A cross was later installed at the Captain's grave by the Commonwealth War Graves Commission. Sergeant Eland was buried at his family's nearby homestead, the Ravenshill Farm, after a burial service that was also read by Rev. Reuter.

Captain Hunt's death was reported in the Manchester Courier and Lancashire General Advertiser on 19 August 1901.

== Legacy ==
Hunt was allegedly engaged to a woman whose sister was engaged to Morant. Hunt's death at the hands of the Viljoen Commando inspired a series of revenge killings which led to Morant's Court-martial and execution.

According to South African historian Arthur Davey, "...Hunt was only 28 when he was killed and therefore younger than his subordinates, Morant and Handcock, and only a year older than the hapless Witton. His tenure as a junior officer in the regular army had been short and it can be supposed that his knowledge of military law was limited. At the courts-martial several witnesses, Sergeant S. Robertson and Lieutenants Morant, Handcock, and Picton mentioned that Hunt had given orders that no prisoners should be taken. Ex-Captain Robertson, giving evidence at the trial of Lenehan, stated that he, Taylor, and Hunt had known the truth about the death of Trooper van Buuren which had been concealed 'in the interest of the corps.' As the Heese case shows, the veracity of Morant and Handcock is suspect, whilst Captain Robertson was a man who had turned King's Evidence, so Hunt's reputation remains, as it were, in limbo."

== In popular culture ==
In the award-winning 1980 film Breaker Morant, Captain Percy Frederick Hunt, who was renamed Simon Hunt, was played by Anglo-Australian actor Terence Donovan. The character was depicted as much older than the real Hunt and was performed with an Australian rather than an English accent.
