= Bushveldt Carbineers =

1901-02 British irregular mounted unit of the Second Boer War

- Pietersburg Light Horse
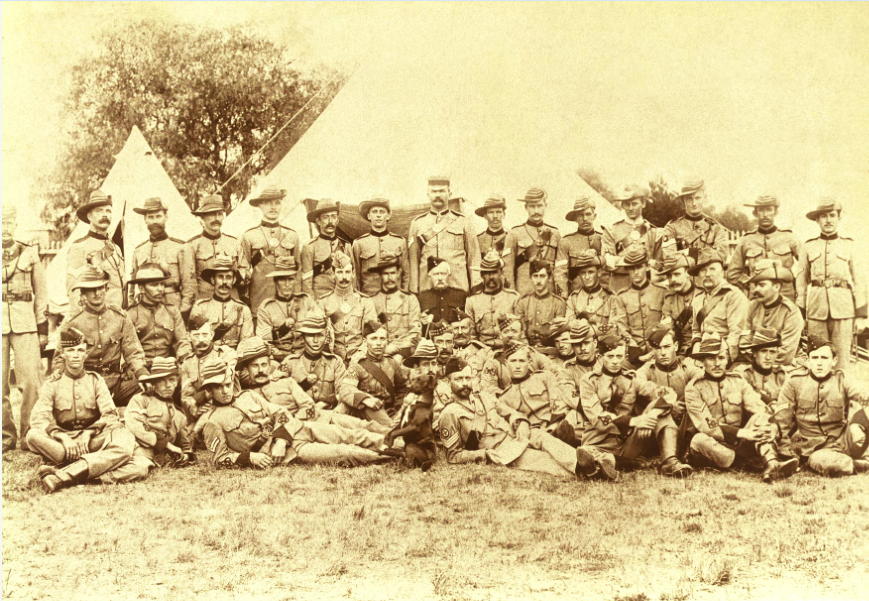
- The Bushveldt Carbineers c. 1901–1902
- Active: 21 February 1901 – 1 December 1901
- Country: South Africa
- Allegiance: British Empire
- Branch: British Army
- Type: Irregular Mounted Infantry, scouts, anti-guerrilla warfare
- Size: Regiment
- Garrison/HQ: Strydpoort; Pietersburg
- Engagements: Second Boer War; Eastern Transvaal Campaigns; Skirmish near Duivelskloof

Commanders
- Notable commanders: Col. Robert Lenehan; Capt. Percy Hunt; Capt. Alfred Taylor

The Bushveldt Carbineers (BVC), later called the Pietersburg Light Horse, was a short-lived irregular mounted infantry regiment raised in South Africa during the Second Boer War.

== Background ==
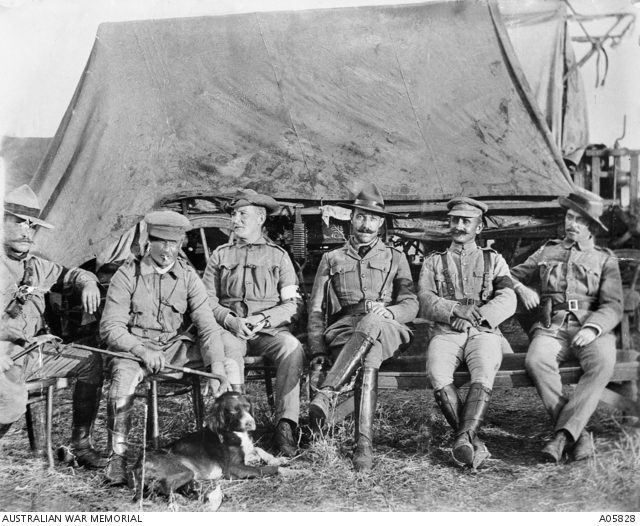
Group portrait of officers of the Bushveldt Carbineers. Left to right: Lieutenant (Lt) Peter Handcock; Lt Henry 'Harry' Harbord Morant; either Dr Johnston or Dr Neel; Captain (Capt) Percy Frederick Hunt; Capt Alfred Taylor, and Lt Harry Picton. Some officers are wearing black armbands for the death of Queen Victoria

The Bushveldt Carbineers (BVC) were formed in order to fight an anti-guerilla war against Boer commandos still active in the Northern Transvaal near the border of Portuguese Mozambique during the guerilla war phase of the Second Boer War.^{:362} Local volunteers were the main target of recruiters, however, as local volunteers were fewer than expected, the unit was largely supplemented by time-expired Australian, English, and Canadian volunteers. According to Robert Wallace's The Australians at the Boer War, 90% of the BVC was made up of Australians.^{:362} Notable volunteers who joined the BVC include Harry Morant, Peter Handcock, and George Witton, who had each previously served in Australian units. Despite paying a high rate of 7 shillings per day the BVC never exceeded more than 320 volunteers during the BVC's existence.^{:362}

The 320-strong regiment was formed on 21 February 1901 and commanded by an Australian, Colonel R. W. Lenehan, who had previously served in the New South Wales Mounted Rifles. The BVC was garrisoned at Pietersburg, 260 kilometers north-east of Pretoria, and saw action in the Spelonken region of the Northern Transvaal, from April–December 1901. The BVC also included 40 Boers who had been recruited at internment camps.^{:362} These Boers were known as the National Scouts, also called hands-uppers (Afrikaans: hensoppers) among the Boers or joiners amongst the British.

== Service ==
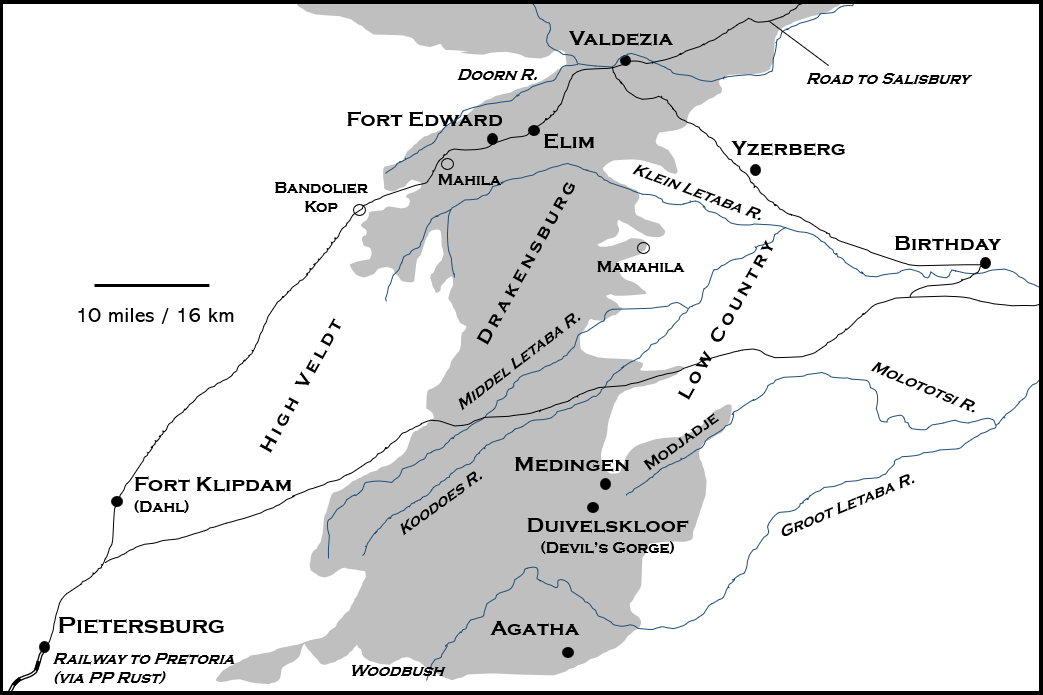
Map of the Bushveldt Carbineers in northern Transvaal

The BVC first saw action when it joined General Herbert Plumer at Warmbad in the spring of 1901 on its march to Pietersburg.^{:362} Beginning on 26 March the column followed the Pretoria-Pietersburg railway line until reaching the Pienaars River. While following the column the BVC was tasked with stopping Boer demolition attacks along the railway. The BVC controversially placed Boer prisoners in empty railcars in order to deter Boer attacks to great affect. Throughout April several hundred Boer commandos surrendered to the BVC near Pietersburg.

By the end of April the BVC operated in two separate columns, one at a military outpost near the north of Pietersburg nicknamed "Fort Edward", and another at an outpost 30 miles (48 km) to the south-east in the Strydpoort district under the command of Lieutenant Morant.^{:362} More Boers surrendered in June to Morant and Captain Hunt's commands at Fort Edward.

In July 1901 Captain Robertson, the commander of A squadron, was dismissed following Robertson's misconduct with Captain Percy Hunt assuming command. A month later in August A squadron captured 18 Boers, 15 wagons, and 500 heads of cattle. On 5 August 1901 Captain Hunt and 17 soldiers of the BVC traveled to the rural Vilijoen farmstead near Duivelskloof roughly 80 miles (130 km) east of Fort Edward in order to captured Veldkornet Viljoen, however, Hunt's command was ambushed by Boer guerrillas of Vilijoen's commando.^{:52} Following Hunt's death Lieutenants Morant, Handcock, Witton, and Picton went on a series of revenge revenge killings of 12 Boer commandos under a "no quarter" policy.

On 7 September 1901 several officers of the BVC including Morant, Handcock, Witton, Taylor, and Picton were arrested and confined to prison in Pietersburg. On 24 October Major Lenehan was also arrested.^{:368} In mid-October 1901 the entire BVC was recalled to Pietersburg and Fort Edward was abandoned.^{:368}

The BVC was disbanded following the court-martial of the majority of its officers and renamed as the Pietersburg Light Horse on 1 December 1901.^{:368}^{:90}

== War crimes ==
Several members of the BVC were arrested for committing war crimes, primarily for the summary execution of prisoners of war under a supposed "no quarter" policy. The following individuals from the BVC were arrested for war crimes:

- Lieutenant Harry Morant
- Lieutenant Peter Handcock
- Lieutenant George Witton
- Captain Alfred Taylor
- Lieutenant Picton
- Sergeant-Major E. Hammett
- C.H.G. Hannam

== Casualties ==
The BVC suffered 15 total casualties; 8 killed in action, 3 died of disease, 4 wounded.

== Commanders ==
- Lt. Colonel Hall.
- Major Robert Lenehan.
- Captain Roberts, original commander of A squadron.
- Captain Alfred Taylor, intelligence officer.
- Captain Percy Hunt, replacement commander of A squadron.

== In popular media ==
The 1980 film Breaker Morant portrays the unit in which Australian Lieutenants Harry Morant and Peter Handcock were serving when they were court martialed. They were executed on 27 February 1902 by a firing squad of Cameron Highlanders, having been convicted by the British army of murdering a civilian and Boer prisoners of war. Morant claimed that the BVC had been ordered not to take prisoners. Lieutenant George Witton, who had been sentenced to death by the same court-martial but whose sentence was later commuted to life imprisonment, was released following a public outcry; he had served 32 months.

== See also ==
- James Christie, an account by a member of the BVC (Bushveldt Carbineers)
