= Frederick de Bertodano =

Australian military officer

Frederick Ramon de Bertodano y Wilson, 8th Marquis de Moral(1871–1955) was an Australian born officer in the British Army during the Second Matabele War and the Second Anglo-Boer War. In his capacity as "Intelligence Officer for Pretoria and the Northern Districts," Captain de Bertodano was instrumental in the investigation that resulted in the court-martial of Breaker Morant.
