= New South Wales Artillery =

- Active: 1871–?
- Country: New South Wales
- Allegiance: British Empire
- Type: Mounted Infantry
- Engagements: Sudan Campaign

The New South Wales Artillery was an artillery unit of the Colony of New South Wales which was raised on 1 August 1871. The unit consisted of one permanent battery and nine volunteer batteries, numbered 1–10 in 1872. An eleventh volunteer battery was formed by 1873. During 1876, a second permanent artillery battery was established, and another added in 1877.

== No.1 Battery ==
Formed as the Sydney Volunteer Artillery in Sydney in 1854, the battery was incorporated into the regiment as No. 1 Battery on 1 August 1871 as a permanent artillery field battery.

== No.2 Battery ==
The battery was formed in August 1876 as a permanent battery. The battery served in the Sudan Campaign but saw only limited action as the war was near its end when it arrived. In 1899, No.2 battery was renamed "A" Battery, Royal Australian Artillery and is still in existence in the order of the Australian Army.

== No.3 Battery ==
The battery was formed in June 1877 as a permanent battery.

== No. 5 Battery ==
Formed as the Third Battery Volunteer Artillery in Newcastle in 1855, the battery was incorporated into the unit as No. 3 Battery (Newcastle) and was renamed the No. 5 Battery (Newcastle) shortly afterwards. The 113 Troop, Royal Australian Artillery is descended from this battery.

== No. 6 Battery ==
Formed as the Wollongong Volunteer Artillery in Wollongong in 1878, the battery was incorporated into the unit as No. 6 Battery (Wollongong). It was later known as No. 6 Battery (Wollongong-Bulli).

== No. 8 Battery ==
Formed as the Bega Volunteer Artillery in Bega in 1885, the battery was incorporated into the unit as No. 8 Battery. The battery was disbanded in 1889.

== No. 11 Battery ==
Formed as the Balmain Volunteer Artillery in Balmain in 1885, the battery was incorporated into the unit as No. 11 Battery in 1889.

== Commanding officers ==
- Airey, George John
