= Field Commander =

2006 video game

- Developer: Sony Online Entertainment
- Publishers: NA: Sony Online Entertainment; PAL: Ubisoft
- Platform: PlayStation Portable
- Release: NA: May 23, 2006; AU: July 22, 2006; EU: July 28, 2006
- Genre: Turn-based tactics
- Modes: Single-player, multiplayer

Field Commander is a military turn-based tactics game for the PlayStation Portable. The player takes on the persona of a new Advanced Tactical Legion for Allied Security (ATLAS) recruit, an international military alliance. The player battles Shadow Nation, a criminal empire.

== Gameplay ==
The multiplayer options include Infrastructure, Ad Hoc, Hot Swap, and a unique feature called Transmission mode, which is somewhat similar to the play by email system of older PC games. While playing in Transmission mode each player takes turns and sends them off to the server.

Players can choose a commanding officer to act as the player's avatar. Divisions determine the player's allegiance as well as Division Bonuses that can be activated. Each division has a unique strength and a corresponding weakness. The 'Card Sharks', for instance, feature strong but slow soldiers, while the 'Killing Depths' have hardened naval vessels at the cost of weak army units.

Fuel and ammunition are finite for vehicles and primary weapons, while infantry have unlimited fuel and secondary weapons have unlimited ammunition. When fuel is exhausted, there is a high chance the unit will explode. All units can be resupplied by either trucks, transports, or cities. Certain division powers can also recover unit health, ammunition and/or petrol. The Section 8's and Foxholes allow units under these two divisions to receive full ammo and fuel as well as increased health.

Fighting works similar to other games in the genre but had many unique elements which included the ability to destroy terrain, degrade and eventually destroy cities, special buildings that could call in attacks from off the board, such as Airstrikes, Napalm Launchers, Satellite Lasers, EMP and concussion blasts, stealth units in every terrain type, as well as the ability to stack units in a single tile. Stacking units could be taken to an extreme. A player can have a plane, a vehicle on a bridge, a boat under the bridge, and a submerged sub all in the same grid space.

Certain terrain will slow down movement, or even be completely impassable. For example, the Teton cannot be traversed by any unit. Swamps slow down treaded units and do not allow wheeled units to proceed. Some terrains also increase or decrease unit defense.

A few units have a ranged attack, allowing them to fire on enemies from a distance, but firing will count as a turn unless that unit is under the effect of a division power.

Units that are 'stealthed' and the 'fog of war' concept both contribute to slowing a unit's movement range. For example, if a player orders a unit to move 5 tiles but there is a hidden enemy on the 3rd tile which is invisible to the player, the unit will automatically stop when it is adjacent to the enemy, despite being told to move 5 tiles.

Revenue can be gained by capturing buildings, and some buildings provide more money than others.

The game also includes a built-in map editor, which allows players to create and share maps with other users online.

== Reception ==
The game has received an 8.4 rating on GameSpot, and an 8.4 from IGN. Field Commander was the first PSP title to receive a perfect score from Official PlayStation Magazine. Review aggregator sites GameRankings and Metacritic gave Field Commander 79% and 77/100 respectively.

Many sources pointed out that Field Commander is similar to Advance Wars, with several reviewers accusing the former of being a clone of the latter.

=== Awards ===
- IGN's award for Best PSP Strategy Game of 2006.
