= Criminal order (international law) =

Legal concept

In international law, a criminal order or illegal order is a military order for the commission of a war crime or other violation of international criminal law. Because superior orders do not exonerate such violations, it is obligatory to disobey the order. Furthermore, the commander is also responsible under the doctrine of command responsibility.

== See also ==
- Befehlsnotstand
- Criminal orders
