= Judicial murder =

Form of wrongful execution

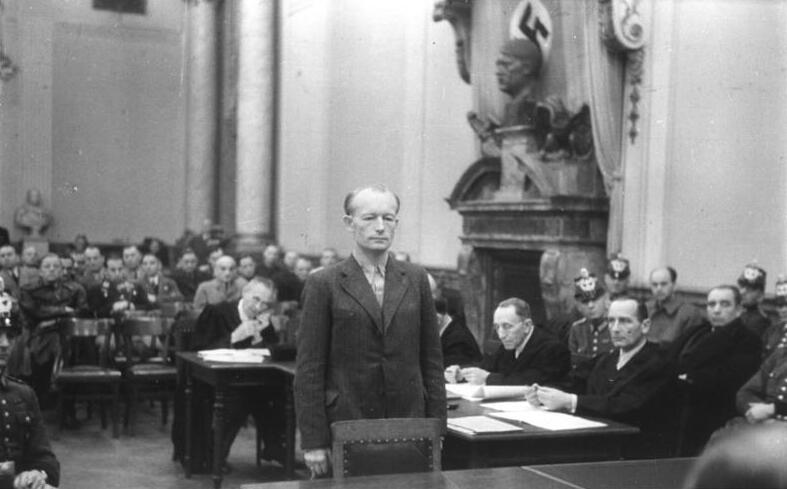
Adolf Reichwein before a Nazi People's Court. He was a victim of judicial murder after a show trial.

Judicial murder is the intentional and premeditated killing of an innocent person by means of capital punishment; therefore, it is a subset of wrongful execution. The Oxford English Dictionary describes it as "death inflicted by process of law, capital punishment, esp. considered to be unjust or cruel". Judicial murder is not to be confused with judicial homicide, which also encompasses the lawful application of capital punishment following a legitimately procured conviction and sentence.

== Example ==
An early case in which charges of judicial murder were raised was the Amboyna massacre in 1623, which caused a legal dispute between the English and Dutch governments over the conduct of a court in the Dutch East Indies that had ordered the execution of ten English men accused of treason. The dispute centered around differing interpretations of the legal jurisdiction of the court in question. The English believed that this court had not been competent to try and execute these East India Company members, and so believed the executions to have been fundamentally illegal, thus constituting "judicial murder". The Dutch, on the other hand, believed the court to have been fundamentally competent, and wished to focus instead on misconduct of the particular judges in the court.

Historian and writer Robert Hutchinson has called the execution of English queen Anne Boleyn a "judicial murder".

== Uses of the term in legal discourse and literature ==
Another early use of the term occurred in Northleigh's Natural Allegiance of 1688; "He would willingly make this Proceeding against the Knight but a sort of Judicial Murder".

In 1777, Voltaire used the comparable term of assassins juridiques ("judicial murderers"). Voltaire was an avowed opponent of capital punishment as such, but most noted for critiquing the French justice system in cases of judicial error, including the infamous cases of Jean Calas, who was executed (allegedly innocent) and Pierre-Paul Sirven, who was acquitted.

The term was used in German (Justizmord) in 1782 by August Ludwig von Schlözer in reference to the execution of Anna Göldi. In a footnote, he explains the term as

"the murder of an innocent, deliberately, and with all the pomp of holy Justice, perpetrated by people installed to prevent murder, or, if a murder has occurred, to see to it that it is punished appropriately."

In 1932, the term was also used by Justice Sutherland in Powell v. Alabama when establishing the right to a court-appointed attorney in all capital cases:

Let us suppose the extreme case of a prisoner charged with a capital offense who is deaf and dumb, illiterate and feeble minded, unable to employ counsel, with the whole power of the state arrayed against him, prosecuted by counsel for the state without assignment of counsel for his defense, tried, convicted and sentenced to death. Such a result … if carried into execution, would be little short of judicial murder.

Hermann Mostar (1956) defends the extension of the term to un-premeditated miscarriages of justice where an innocent suffers the death penalty.

== Show trials ==
The term is often applied to show trials that result in a death penalty and has been applied to the deaths of Nikolai Bukharin, Milada Horáková, the eleven people executed after the Slánský trial and Zulfikar Ali Bhutto.

In 1985, the West German Bundestag declared that the Nazi People's Court was an instrument of judicial murder.

== See also ==
- Capital punishment
- Extrajudicial murder
- Hanging judge
- Monopoly on violence
