= The Bomb (play) =

The Bomb is a play by Kevin Dyer, focusing on the IRA Brighton bombing of 1984.

It is sourced from interviews, research and actual and imagined dialogue. It is not a verbatim play, but is partly factual and describes real events. The Bomb has twice toured nationally, and was nominated for two Theatrical Management Awards.

== Premise ==
In 2000, Jo Berry, whose father was killed in the blast, met Patrick Magee, the man who planted the bomb. The Bomb is inspired by the events which led Berry and Magee to meet and the impact those people had on each other.
