= Tiocfaidh ár lá =

Irish-language republican slogan

Tiocfaidh ár lá (Irish pronunciation: [ˈtʲʊkiː aːɾˠ ˈl̪ˠaː] TCHUH-kee ar lah) is an Irish language sentence which translates as "our day will come". It is a slogan of Irish republicanism. "Our day" is the date hoped for by Irish nationalists on which a united Ireland is achieved. The slogan was coined in the 1970s during the Troubles in Northern Ireland and variously credited to Bobby Sands or Gerry Adams.

It has been used by Sinn Féin representatives, appeared on graffiti and political murals, and been shouted by IRA defendants being convicted in British and Irish courts, and by their supporters in the public gallery. For Timothy Shanahan, the slogan "captures [a] confident sense of historical destiny". Derek Lundy comments, "Its meaning is ambiguous. It promises a new day for a hitherto repressed community, but it is also redolent of payback and reprisal."

Some Irish-language speakers claim that the slogan is ungrammatical, unidiomatic, or "deviant". It is familiar enough to have spawned various parodies. Alternative slogans include "Beidh an lá linn" ("the day will be with us") and "Beidh lá eile ag an bPaorach!" ("Power will have another day!").

== Origins ==
The literal English phrase "our day will come" has been used in unrelated contexts, for example as the title of a 1963 pop song by Ruby & the Romantics. A foreshadowing of the republican slogan is in James Joyce's A Portrait of the Artist as a Young Man, when the nationalist Michael Davin (based on George Clancy) says Irish republicans "died for their ideals, Stevie. Our day will come yet, believe me."

The Irish phrase tiocfaidh ár lá is attributed to Bobby Sands, a prisoner held at Maze Prison and member of the Provisional IRA – an Irish republican paramilitary force that sought to end British rule in Northern Ireland, facilitate Irish reunification and the establishment of an independent republic. He uses the phrase in several writings smuggled out of the Maze Prison. It is the last sentence of the diary he kept of the 1981 hunger strike in which he died, published in 1983 as One Day in my Life. However, Diarmait Mac Giolla Chríost has antedated the slogan to a pamphlet published in c. 1975–77 by Gerry Adams of his experiences in the Maze. Adams himself has ascribed the slogan to Republican prisoners generally, both men in the Maze and women in Armagh Prison. Many republicans learned Irish in prison (a phenomenon known as "Jailtacht", a pun on Gaeltacht), and conversed regularly with each other through Irish, both for cultural reasons and to keep secrets from the wardens. The Irish language revival movement has often overlapped with Irish nationalism, particularly in Northern Ireland. Tiocfaidh ár lá has been called "the battle cry of the blanketmen". Republican consciousness raising around the hunger strikes increased awareness of the Irish language in Northern Ireland's nationalist community.

Some Irish-language speakers, including Ciarán Carson, contend that tiocfaidh ár lá is ungrammatical or at least unidiomatic, reflecting L1 interference from English, a phenomenon dubbed Béarlachas. Mac Giolla Chríost is less categorical, on the basis that tiocfaidh an lá ('the day will come') is standard Irish; on the other hand, he says tiocfaidh ár lá typifies the "deviant" nature of Jailtacht Irish.

== Instances ==
Patrick Magee said Tiocfaidh ár lá after being sentenced in 1986 for the 1984 Brighton hotel bombing, while his wife in the gallery wore a Katharine Hamnett-style T-shirt with the slogan. Loyalist paramilitary Michael Stone got past the Republican security cordon to commit the 1988 Milltown Cemetery attack by saying tiocfaidh ár lá. One of four loyalist paramilitaries shouted the phrase at a court sentencing in 2002. At the 2018 Sinn Féin ard fheis, new party leader Mary Lou McDonald concluded her speech with tiocfaidh ár lá. The phrase, which was not on the script circulated in advance, was criticised by politicians from Fianna Fáil ("hark back to a very dark time"), Fine Gael ("irresponsible"), and the Ulster Unionist Party ("stale rhetoric").

Tiocfaidh Ár Lá (TÁL) is the name of a fanzine for Celtic F.C.'s Irish republican ultras. It was established in 1991, at which time Celtic were enduring a period of prolonged inferiority to Rangers F.C., their Old Firm rivals, giving "our day will come" an extra resonance. Irish-American folk-rock band LeperKhanz released a 2005 album named Tiocfaidh Ár Lá.

The 1992 and 1993 editions of Macmillan's The Student Book: The Indispensable Applicant's Guide to UK Colleges, Polytechnics and Universities advised potential University of Ulster students that "Tiocfaioh ar la" [sic] was a common greeting on campus and meant "pleased to meet you". This error, suspected to be the result of a prank, was expunged from the 1994 edition. In A Reality Tour, a 2003 concert filmed at the Point Depot in Dublin, David Bowie says Tiocfaidh ár [lá] during the applause after "Rebel Rebel". Gerry Leonard claims to have suggested it to Bowie.

In 2019, Una Mullally commented about an upsurge in the appropriation of Troubles-era slogans by young Irish people on both sides of the border: "There's a tacit understanding that a lot of the mindless repetition of IRA slogans such as 'Tiocfaidh ár lá', 'Up the RA' and 'Brits out' is purposefully goofy – even if the latter two at least are offensive." A performance the same year in University College Dublin by Kneecap, an Irish-language hip hop trio from West Belfast, was terminated when they led the audience in a chant of Tiocfaidh ár lá, breaching the university's policies for "Dignity", "Respect", and "Equality, Diversity & Inclusion". JD Sports apologised in 2020 when its online catalogue depicted a branded kit for the Northern Ireland football team worn by a model with a visible tattoo reading "ticofaidh ár lá" [sic]. In 2021, a Derry charity video Christmas card was withdrawn after protests of its depiction of Gerry Adams singing "Deck the Halls" with "Fa, la, la, la, la, la ..." changed to "tiocfaidh ár lá, lá, lá ...".

=== Legal cases ===
The 2007 arrest of Irish-language activist Máire Nic an Bhaird in Belfast was allegedly in part for saying tiocfaidh ár lá to Police Service of Northern Ireland officers, although she claimed to have said tiocfaidh bhur lá ("your day will come"). She was acquitted on appeal in September 2007.

In 2014, a man who shouted the phrase outside a McDonald's in Belfast was convicted of disorderly behaviour when his defence of freedom of expression was rejected.

In 2017, the Fair Employment Tribunal awarded damages to a Catholic employee who had been dismissed after taking sick leave in response to a Protestant manager shouting Tiocfaidh ár lá at her.

== Allusions ==
=== IRA ===
Sinéad Morrissey's 2002 poem "Tourism", describing the economic boom that followed the peace process, states ironically "Our day has come." Gearóid Mac Lochlainn, a Belfast-born Irish-language poet, uses the phrase in a 2002 poem, "Ag Siopadóireacht" ("Shopping"), characterised by Mac Giolla Chríost as "the voice of youthful rebellion, ... of hip-hop". In Mac Lochlainn's own English translation of his poem, Tiocfaidh ár lá is left untranslated. Paul Muldoon's 2011 poem "Barrage Balloons, Buck Alec, Bird Flu and You", dedicated to Dermot Seymour, contains the lines "Even Christ's checking us out from his observation post. / Even he can't quite bend Tiocfaidh Ár Lá to the tune of 'Ghost / Riders in the Sky.'" Kevin Higgins' 2019 English-language poem "Tiocfaidh Do Lá" ["your day will come"] is a satire directed at a unionist who will be forced to learn Irish.

=== Other ===
Margo Harkin's Derry-set 1990 film Hush-a-Bye Baby has "a witty scene which nevertheless offended many nationalists": a republican youth confronts a British soldier with a disjointed mishmash of Irish-language names and phrases, ending with Tiocfaidh ár lá, only for the soldier to challenge him in fluent Irish. In 1993 Desmond Fennell charged the Dublin 4 establishment with neoliberalism and cultural cringe, ends with a call for a "deprovincialised, deimperialised world ... Tiocfaidh ár lá." Gerald Dawe said this "reads like the old 'Irish-Ireland' cultural missal". The introduction, by Stephen Brown of Ulster University, to a 2006 survey of "Celtic marketing" was titled "Tiocfaidh ár lá".

Commenting on unionist Peter Robinson's impending retirement at a 2015 meeting of the North/South Ministerial Council, Sinn Féin's Martin McGuinness said, "my day too will come at some stage", at which Robinson sparked laughter by responding, "It's Tiocfaidh ár Lá isn't it." Bookmaker Paddy Power advertised its odds for the outcome of Ireland's 2015 same-sex marriage referendum using a photo of kissing men wearing paramilitary-style balaclavas and the tagline Tiocfaidh ár lá.

The Irish rebel song 'SAM song' contains the chorus "Tiocfaidh Ar Lá, sing Up the 'Ra, SAM missiles in the sky".

In October 2021, former UK Independence Party leader Nigel Farage unwittingly used republican slogans in several scripted video clips ordered via Cameo, including a putative birthday message to "Gerard" from "Con and Maggie" at "Chucky Arlaw's in Brighton".

== Variants ==
Similar slogans include:

Beidh an lá linn
(Irish pronunciation: [bʲɛj ə ˈl̪ˠaː lʲɪn̠ʲ]) literally translates as "the day will be with us". Ciarán Carson says it is more idiomatic Irish than tiocfaidh ár lá. The hybrid form beidh ár lá linn ([bʲɛj aːɾˠ ˈl̪ˠaː lʲɪn̠ʲ]; "our day will be with us") is also found among republicans.

Beidh lá eile ag an bPaorach!
([bʲɛj ˈl̪ˠaː ɛlʲə ɡə bˠiːɾˠəx]; "Power will have another day!") were the last words from the gallows of Edmund Power of Dungarvan, executed for his part in the Wexford Rebellion of 1798. The phrase was often cited by Éamon de Valera. It occurs in the play An Giall, by Brendan Behan; his English translation, The Hostage, renders it "we'll have another day". It is echoed in There will be another day, the title of republican Peadar O'Donnell's 1963 memoir. The slogan is not exclusively a political slogan, and may simply mean "another chance will come".

Parodies of tiocfaidh ár lá include:

Chucky
an English-language pronunciation spelling of tiocfaidh, it is pejorative for an Irish republican (sometimes shortened to Chuck).
Tiocfaidh Armani
mocking Sinn Féin's move towards respectability from the peace process
"Tiocfaidh Ar La La"
on T-shirts depicting the eponymous Teletubby as an IRA member.
"Tiocfaidh Arlene"
various jokes about Arlene Foster, former leader of the Democratic Unionist Party and First Minister of Northern Ireland.

== See also ==
- Irish language in Northern Ireland
- Slán abhaile, "safe [journey] homeward", ironic republican farewell to British Army forces
- Siege of Derry, origin of the loyalist slogan "No Surrender"
