= Patrick Magee =

Patrick Magee may refer to:

- Patrick Magee (actor) (1922–1982), Northern Irish stage and film actor
- Patrick Magee (Irish republican) (born 1951), member of the Provisional Irish Republican Army
