= Brighton hotel bombing =

1984 IRA assassination attempt on Margaret Thatcher

Coordinates: 50°49′17″N 0°08′50″W

- Part of the Troubles
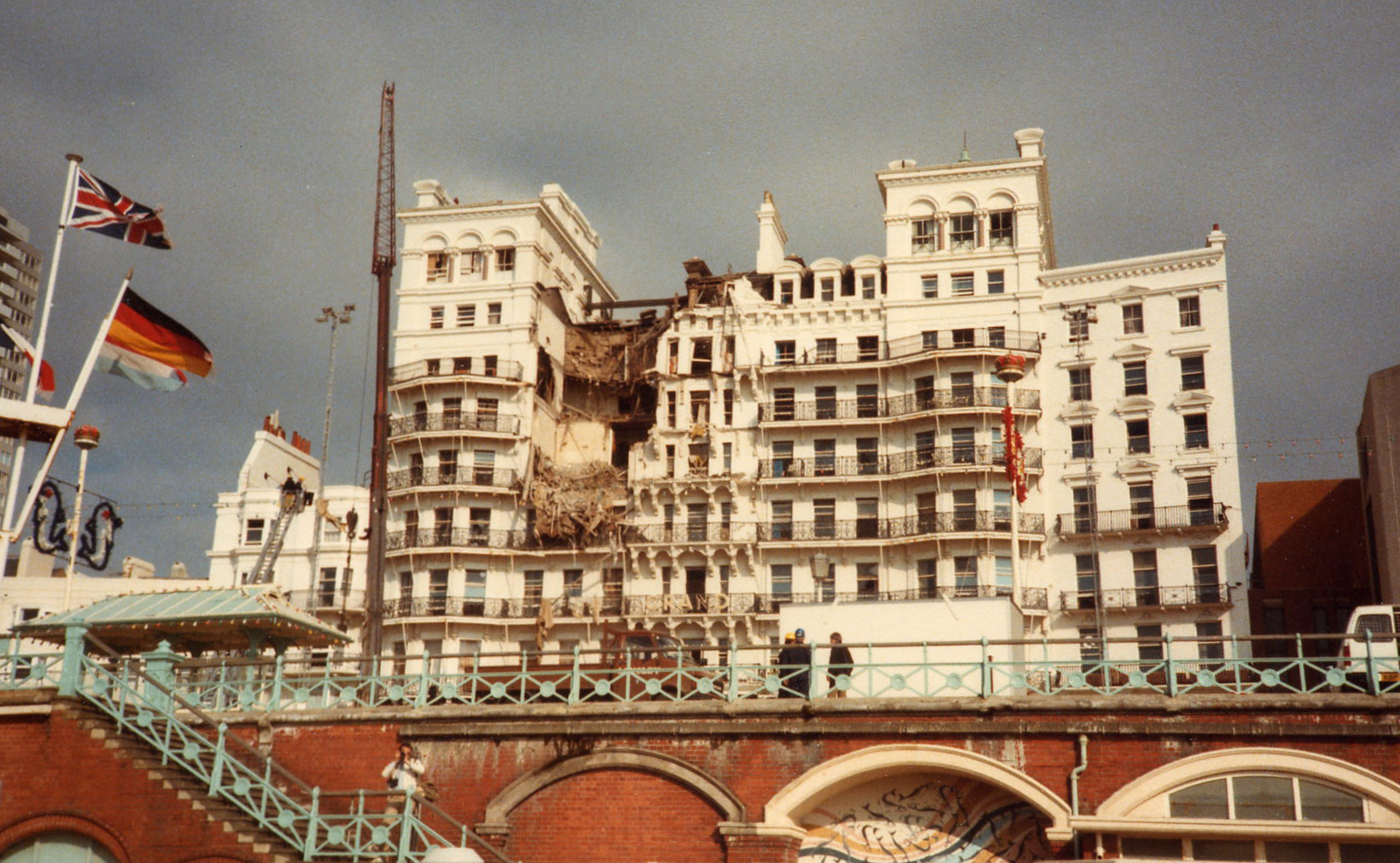
- The Grand Hotel on the morning after the bombing
- Location: Grand Hotel, Brighton, East Sussex, England
- Date: 12 October 1984; 42 years ago 2:54 am (BST)
- Target: Margaret Thatcher and her cabinet
- Attack type: Bombing
- Weapon: Time bomb
- Deaths: 5
- Injuries: 31–34 (Note: Sources differ on the number of casualties. Figures given include 31, 32, 33 and 34.)
- Perpetrator: Provisional Irish Republican Army

On 12 October 1984 the Provisional Irish Republican Army (IRA) attempted to assassinate members of the British government, including the prime minister, Margaret Thatcher, at the Grand Hotel in Brighton, England. Five people were killed, including the Conservative MP Sir Anthony Berry; more than thirty people were injured. Thatcher was uninjured. The bombing was a key moment in the Troubles, the conflict in Northern Ireland between unionists and republicans over the constitutional position of Northern Ireland, which took place between the late 1960s and 1998.

The IRA decided to assassinate Thatcher during the 1981 Irish hunger strike. Her stance against the return of Special Category Status to republican prisoners—the status that meant they were treated as political prisoners, rather than as criminals—meant the strike was not quickly settled, and ten prisoners died. After two years of planning, including reconnoitering the 1982 and 1983 Conservative Party Conferences, a long-delay time bomb was planted in the hotel by the IRA member Patrick Magee more than three weeks before the 1984 conference. The IRA knew the hotel would be occupied by Thatcher and many of her cabinet.

The bomb exploded at 2:54 am when most guests were in bed. The force of the explosion was upwards and broke through the roof, dislodging one of the hotel's chimney stacks, which weighed five long tons (5.1 t). This crashed through several floors, killing or injuring many of the occupants. Thatcher decided to continue the conference as normal, and was given a standing ovation by delegates as she entered the stage just six and a half hours after the explosion.

The investigation took eight months. A partial palm print was found on the room registration card from when Magee checked in and police surveillance on IRA members led them to him. In 1986 he was tried, found guilty and sent to prison for eight concurrent life sentences, with the recommendation that he serve at least thirty-five years before being considered for parole. He was released under licence in June 1999 as part of the Good Friday Agreement. Negotiations between the British and Irish governments that had begun in 1980 continued despite the bombing, although the pace of the talks was slowed to ensure it did not appear that the British government was conceding to pressure because of the bomb. They resulted in the 1985 Anglo-Irish Agreement, which gave the Irish government an advisory role in Northern Ireland's government.

== Background ==
=== The Troubles in the late 1970s and 1980s ===
The Troubles were the conflict in Northern Ireland that began in the late 1960s between the majority population of unionists and the republican minority. (Note: The start date of the Troubles is a matter of debate. Early dates focus on the formation of the Ulster Volunteer Force in 1966; the later dates are based on the deployment of British troops on 14 August 1969. The Northern Ireland Troubles (Legacy and Reconciliation) Act 2023 defined the start of the Troubles as 1 January 1966 for the purposes of the act. The end date is similarly questioned. Suggested dates range from the date the IRA declared a ceasefire on 20 July 1997 to 8 May 2007, when there was agreement to return to devolved government.) The unionists—also known as loyalists—wanted Northern Ireland to remain within the UK; Irish republicans wanted Northern Ireland to leave the UK and join a united Ireland. According to the political scientist Stephen Kelly, four events impacted the approach and policies towards Northern Ireland of Margaret Thatcher, the leader of the Opposition and then prime minister: the assassination of Airey Neave; the assassination of Lord Mountbatten and the Warrenpoint ambush, which took place on the same day; and the 1981 Irish hunger strike.

In March 1979 Neave, the shadow secretary of state for Northern Ireland, was assassinated by the Irish National Liberation Army in a car bomb attack in the Palace of Westminster. Neave was a friend and political mentor to Thatcher, who was described by her biographer Jonathan Aitken as being "numb with shock" at the news of his death.

On 27 August 1979—less than four months after Thatcher became prime minister—Mountbatten was killed by a bomb on his fishing boat, off the coast of Mullaghmore, County Sligo, in the Irish Republic. The device had been planted by the Provisional Irish Republican Army (IRA). On the same day, the IRA also killed eighteen British soldiers near Warrenpoint, with two bombs—the most deaths suffered in a single incident by the British Army during the Troubles.

In March 1981 Bobby Sands, an IRA member who was imprisoned at the Maze prison, Northern Ireland, went on hunger strike for the return of Special Category Status (SCS) to prisoners. SCS involved treating those prisoners under different, more favourable, conditions with the status of political prisoners rather than as criminals. It included not having to wear prison uniform and being able to freely associate with other prisoners. (Note: "Special Category Status" was introduced in 1972 by the home secretary, William Whitelaw, as part of a deal to bring about an IRA ceasefire; it was withdrawn on 1 March 1976 for all new prisoners.) While on hunger strike, Sands stood in the Fermanagh and South Tyrone by-election and won. Thatcher remained unmoved on the point of allowing Special Category Status and said "There can be no question of political status for someone who is serving a sentence for crime. Crime is crime is crime: it is not political, it is crime, and there can be no question of granting political status". Ten men died of starvation before the strike came to an end. Sands was the first to die, which he did on 5 May 1981, after 66 days of starvation; his death led to rioting in republican areas of Northern Ireland.

Because of the hunger strikes and the deaths of those involved, Thatcher was reviled by Irish republicans. According to the political scientist Richard English, Thatcher was "a republican hate-figure of Cromwellian proportions". English highlights as examples comments about Thatcher from the IRA member Danny Morrison: "that unctuous, self-righteous fucker" and "the biggest bastard we have ever known". Because of her staunch unionist position and because they considered her responsible for the deaths of the hunger strikers, the IRA leadership decided to try to assassinate her before the hunger strikes ended.

=== Thatcher's approach to Northern Ireland, 1979–1984 ===
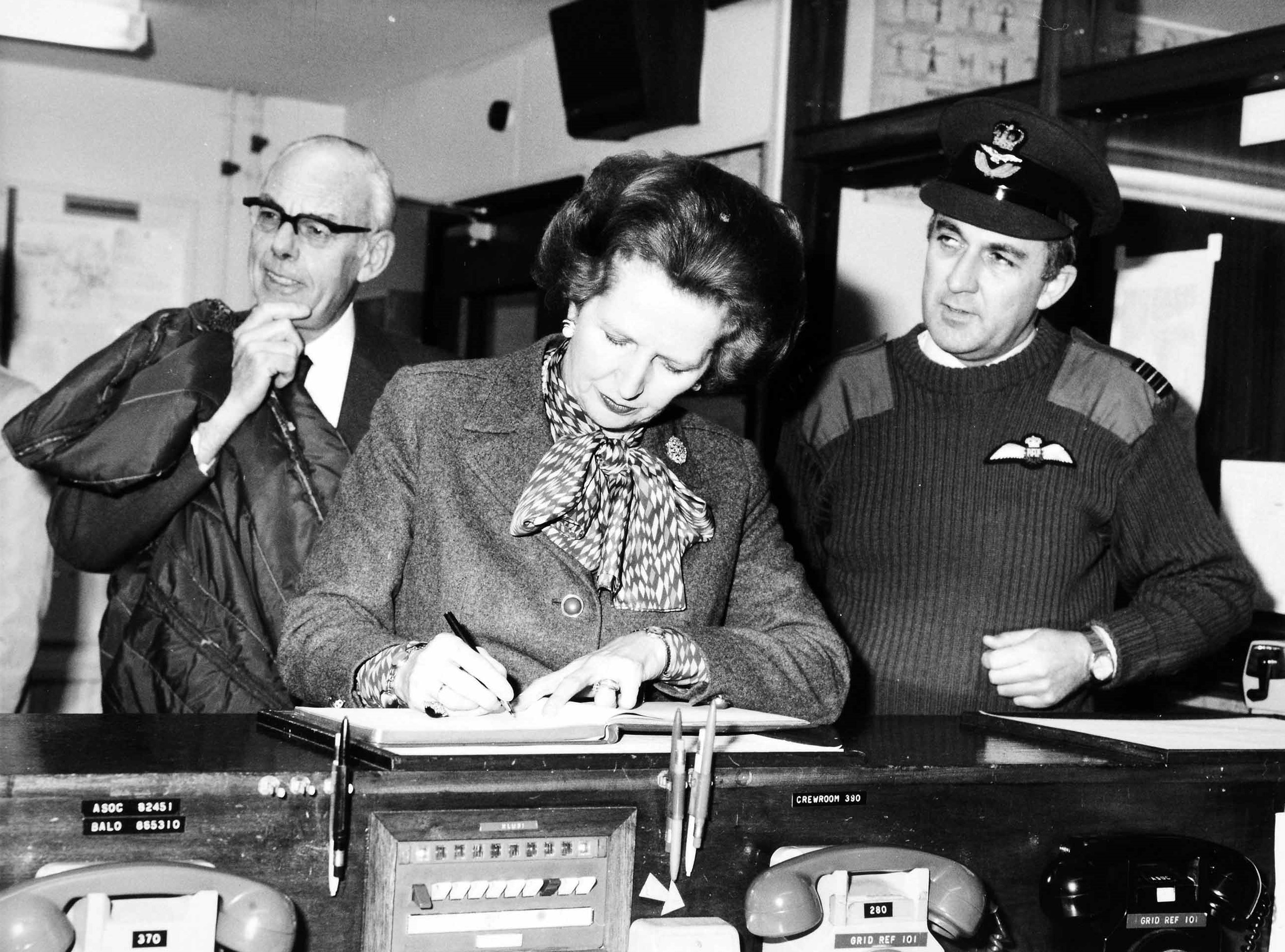
Margaret Thatcher, with her husband Denis (left), visiting Northern Ireland in 1982

Thatcher's outlook on Northern Ireland came from an inherently unionist position; she wanted a military victory over the IRA and "integration", that is, treating Northern Ireland like the rest of the UK, rather than having separate laws and political processes. Her support for integration, however, was abandoned after Neave's death and after she came to power. According to Eamonn Kennedy, the Irish ambassador to the UK between 1978 and 1983, the murder of Neave and the deaths of British soldiers "left deep psychological scars" on her Irish outlook.

Thatcher's unionist stance was intuitive; in her autobiography she wrote "My own instincts are profoundly Unionist. ... But, then, any Conservative should in his bones be a Unionist too. Our party has always, throughout its history, been committed to the defence of the Union." Kelly considers that "Thatcher's attitude to Northern Ireland was a powerful blend of reactionary policies and personal indifference." She admitted ignorance of the nuances of Northern Irish politics, and said in her memoirs "But what British politician will ever fully understand Northern Ireland?"

According to Kelly, the focal point of Thatcher's hardline approach to Northern Ireland was security and the need to defeat paramilitary—specifically republican—violence. There was flexibility in her approach, however. During the hunger strikes, she personally gave the go-ahead for secret talks with the IRA to bring about a negotiated end to the strike. In 1980, despite saying publicly that the Irish Republic had no right to interfere with the UK's governing of Northern Ireland, she met Charles Haughey, the taoiseach (the Irish prime minister), to discuss the relationship.

=== Patrick Magee ===
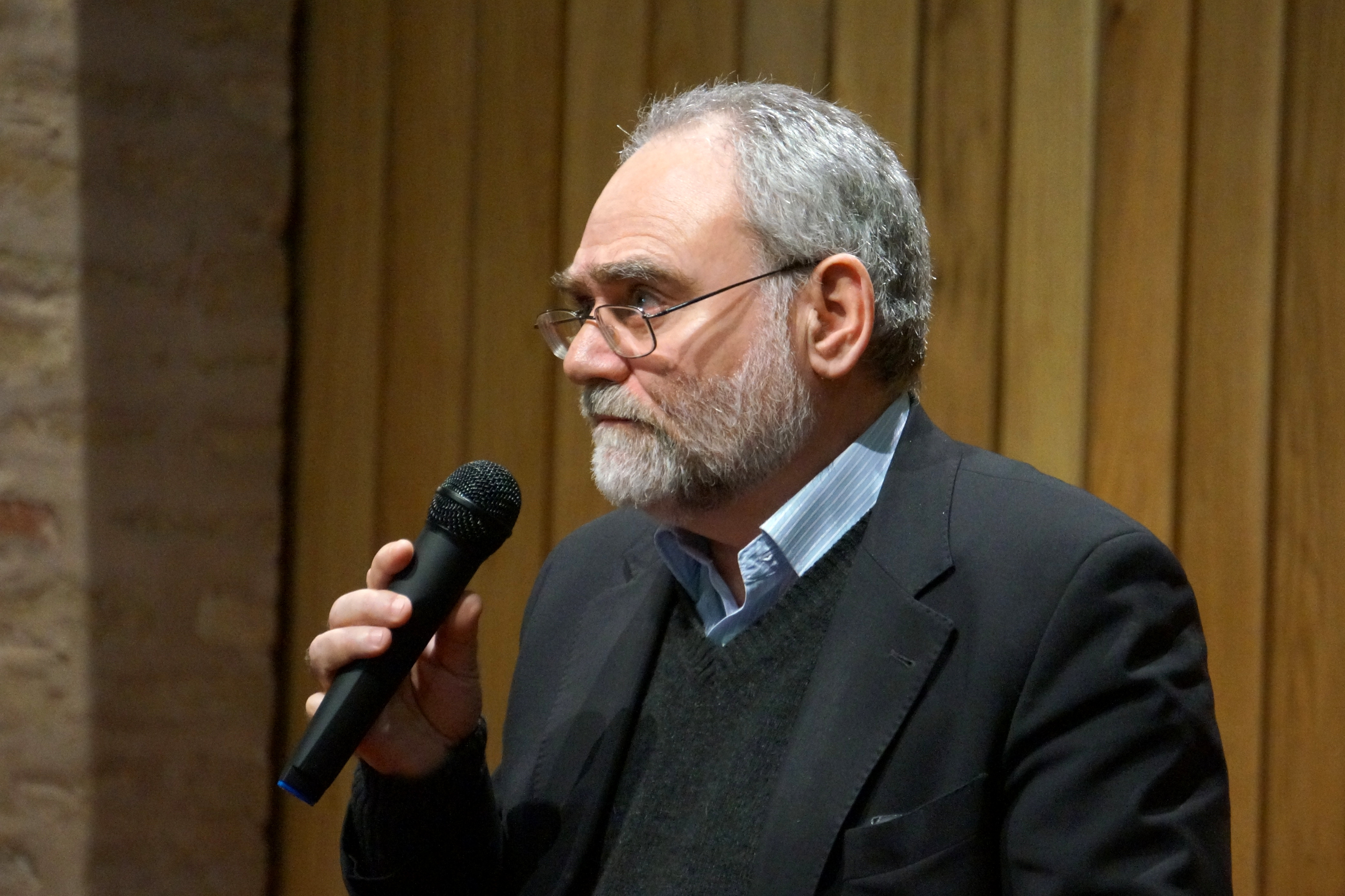
Patrick Magee in 2014

Patrick Magee was born in Belfast in 1951 and moved to Norwich, Norfolk, when he was two. In 1971 he returned to Belfast, and joined the IRA in 1972 after attending a shebeen—an illicit drinking den—in the Unity Flats area of Belfast, raided by British soldiers. He was beaten and detained for thirty-six hours without charge; in 2001 he said the incident left him with "a sense of anger. Real anger. I felt I just couldn't walk away from this". He was soon assigned to be one of the IRA's "engineering officers", the organisation's term for a bomb maker. He was interned (detained without trial) at Long Kesh prison from June 1973 to November 1975. In the mid-1970s the IRA changed its structure from a battalion to a cell-based system. Each cell—also called an active service unit (ASU)—normally comprised four volunteers, of which only the leader was in contact with the level above. At this time Magee joined the England Department, the IRA's ASU that operated in England. He was periodically active there between 1978 and 1979, and in 1983.

In 1983 Magee was part of the ASU that planned to bomb the Eagle and Child pub in Lancashire, popular with soldiers as it was situated next to Weeton Barracks. His IRA handler in England was Raymond O'Connor, who rented a flat for Magee and a comrade, and drove the pair to the location to view the target. O'Connor had been arrested by Lancashire Special Branch the previous year and been identified as a member of the IRA; he had been recruited by police as an informer and was passing details of Magee's mission to them. Magee and his comrade became suspicious of O'Connor and realised they were under surveillance; they returned to Dublin. When the pair told their IRA superiors that they had been followed, they were not believed. Magee later wrote that "There was a suspicion at home that we had panicked. No one could credit that we had narrowly escaped a trap. ... It appeared my operational days were over. I remember saying as much to a comrade, who agreed." (Note: The surveillance was later raised during Magee's trial, proving to his disbelieving comrades that he had been telling the truth.)

== Build-up ==
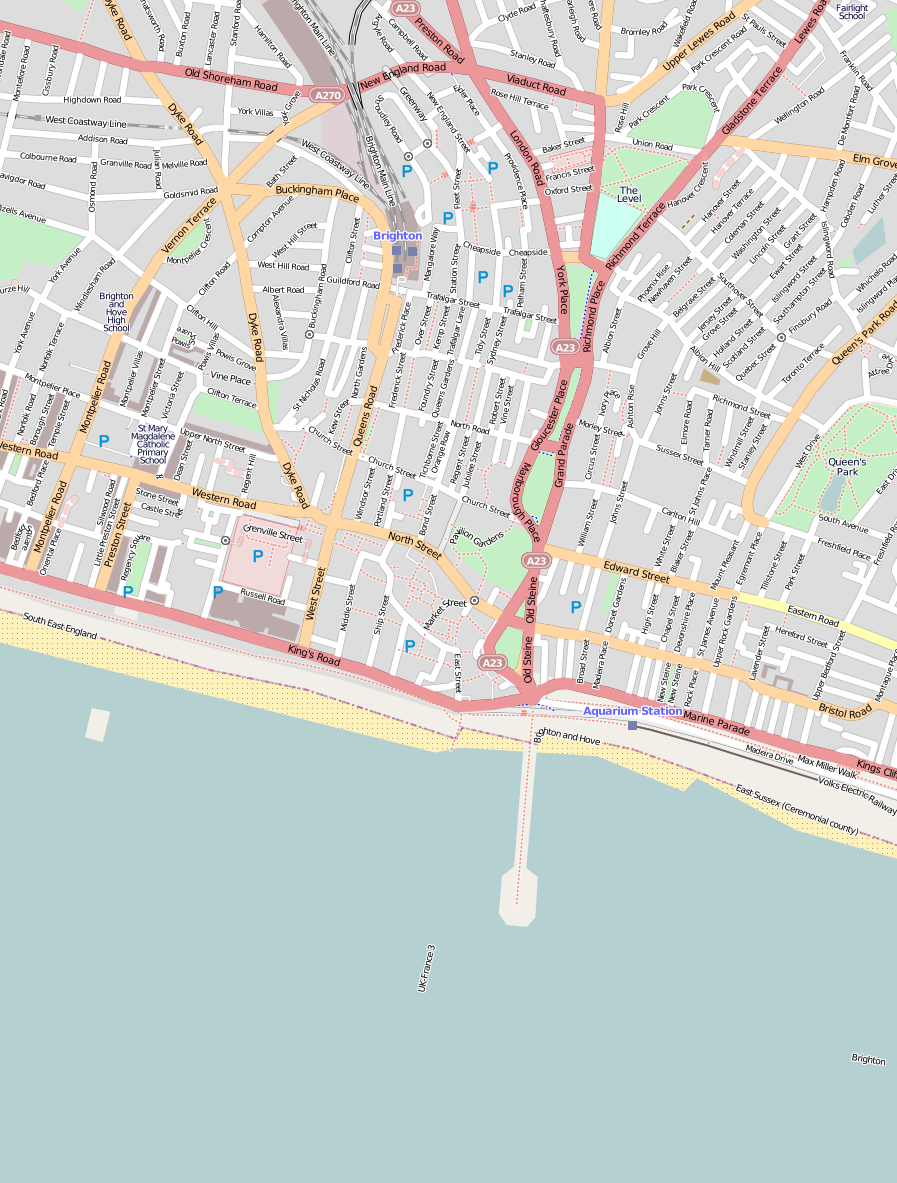
Location of the Grand Hotel, on the waterfront at Brighton, East Sussex

Having decided to assassinate Thatcher, IRA intelligence officers began to monitor her movements and security arrangements. In 1982 two IRA volunteers went to the Conservative Party conference in Brighton, on Britain's south coast. Magee and another IRA member visited Blackpool on the north-west coast, where the 1983 conference was scheduled to take place. It was decided to make the attempt in 1984 when the conference would be back in Brighton. After police arrested two members of the England Department—Thomas Quigley and Paul Kavannagh—Magee was selected as the bomb maker.

On 15 September 1984—some four weeks before the Conservative Party Conference—Magee registered at the Grand Hotel in Brighton under the pseudonym "Roy Walsh". He used the name of the IRA bomber who had been convicted for his role in the IRA's 1973 Old Bailey bombing. After completing the hotel's registration card, Magee gave a false address (27 Braxfield Road, London, SE4), stated he was English, omitted his passport details and paid £180 for three nights' stay. (Note: £180 in 1984 equates to approximately £1,000 in 2025, according to calculations based on the Consumer Price Index measure of inflation.) He asked for, and was given, room 629, on the sixth floor; he asked for an upper floor as he thought that would be where Thatcher would stay. The higher level was because the IRA planners thought Thatcher would want additional security in case striking miners took over areas of the hotel.

On the day he arrived Magee had lunch at the hotel's restaurant with a man named "The Pope". The man visited Magee over the following three days but did not stay overnight. Two female IRA couriers delivered bomb materials to the room; neither of the women nor the other man have been identified. The journalist Rory Carroll, who wrote a history of the bombing, considers that "It is unlikely that more than four people were involved". According to Magee, the bomb comprised 105 pounds (48 kg) of gelignite; security forces later erroneously said it was 30 pounds (14 kg) of Semtex. The device was fitted with a long-delay timer, such as the type used in videocassette recorders. The timing unit was battery powered and a Memo Park timer was also incorporated into the device; Carroll considers the timer was probably part of an anti-handling device, designed to counter any interference by a bomb disposal team if the device was found before detonation.

To mask the smell of the explosives—a distinctive aroma similar to almonds—the device was wrapped in several layers of plastic. Once the bomb was set, Magee removed the side panel of the bath and placed the device within the space. He and his colleagues finished around 10:00 pm on 17 September, and ordered a bottle of vodka and three bottles of Coca-Cola to be delivered to the room. He spent the third night in the room and checked out at around 9:00 am the following day.

== Conference and explosion, 9–12 October 1984 ==
The Grand Hotel, showing the position of the explosion and the fall of the chimney in relation to where the prime minister and cabinet members were

The conference began on 9 October 1984 and was scheduled to last four days; Thatcher's speech was scheduled for the final day. Thatcher was staying in the hotel's Napoleon Suite, three rooms with a sea view on the first floor. Her staff set up an office in rooms across the corridor. Before her arrival, a police dog and handler searched the suite and other rooms on the first floor, but none of the rooms on the other floors. The search was cursory; the officer spent only thirty minutes in her rooms. The officer later recalled that the suite had staff and aides walking in and out while he worked. Uniformed and plainclothes police were posted in and outside the hotel.

On the evening of 11 October Norman Tebbit—secretary of state for trade and industry—and his wife Margaret attended a reception hosted by Alistair McAlpine, the treasurer of the Conservative Party; they left at around midnight and returned to their room. A ball was being held in nearby Top Rank ballroom, which Thatcher visited for 45 minutes, returning to the hotel at about 11:45 pm. In her suite, she continued to work on her conference speech. She finished at around 2:45 am and decided to work on some government business with Robin Butler, her principal private secretary, before going to bed. She went to the toilet and returned to her desk at 2:52 am.

The bomb exploded at 2:54 am on 12 October 1984. The occupants of room 629 were Sir Donald Maclean—the president of the Scottish Conservatives—and his wife Muriel; they were in bed at the time. She was blown sideways by the blast; he was blown upwards. In the neighbouring room, 628, Lady Shattock, the wife of Sir Gordon Shattock, the Western Area chairman of the Conservative Party, was bending over the bath; the wall between the bathroom of 629 and 628 disintegrated, and fragments of the ceramic tiles were "driven into her body like bullets", according to an army explosives expert. She was decapitated and her body was blown across the corridor into room 638. Her husband fell through the collapsing floors down to the basement but survived.

The force of the explosion going upward broke through the roof and dislodged one of the hotel's chimney stacks; eleven feet (3.4 m) tall, it weighed five long tons (5.1 t). It fell through the roof, through the rooms ending in 28 and clipping those ending in 29. The bomb and the falling chimney took out much of the front of the building, creating a hole thirty feet (9.1 m) deep and fifteen feet (4.6 m) wide. As the chimney fell through the roof, it destroyed all the rooms ending in 28. First was 528 where Eric Taylor—the North-West Area chairman of the Conservative Party—was staying; he was killed. Room 428 accommodated John Wakeham, the chief whip; his wife Roberta was killed. In room 328 Sir Anthony Berry, the deputy chief whip, was also killed. In 228 was Norman Tebbit and his wife Margaret. Tebbit later recalled:

the ceiling came crashing down on us and then, in a hail of debris, the floor collapsed, catapulting us down under an avalanche of bricks, timber and plaster. The force of the impact was indescribable—blow after blow as the debris smashed on to my left side. Something tore into my abdomen with a terrible blow and I heard my very guts sloshing inside me. There was a colossal impact tearing a great hole in my side, then I stopped falling—with no idea where, nor even which way up I was, as the debris cascaded down.

Thatcher's room was below the Tebbits'; her bathroom was badly damaged but she, her husband and Robin Butler were all uninjured. According to Carroll, the bomb "did not even scratch her. But it came very, very close." He theorised that if she had still been in the bathroom, "she would have been cut to ribbons, perhaps fatally".

== Immediate aftermath, 12 October 1984 ==
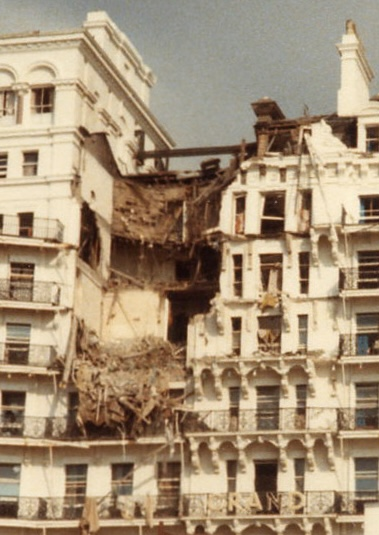
Close-up of the damage caused by the bomb; the surviving chimney visible was equal in size to the one that fell through the hotel

Sussex Police and the East Sussex Fire Brigade were soon on the scene. One of the first policemen to arrive, Paul Parton, later described what he remembered:

As we got closer and the dust was starting to settle, you could see [a policeman] laying on the ground, being supported by other policemen, people screaming, hanging off balconies, alarm bells ringing, water pouring out of broken pipes, and you could see the people up on the balcony. It was horrific.

On arrival with three fire engines, station officer Fred Bishop of the fire brigade requested ten more and as many ambulances as could be spared. Although fire brigade regulations for attending a bombing were that, unless there was a fire in progress, the fire engines were to park two streets away, maintain radio silence and wait for the bomb squad, Bishop and his crew entered the hotel. Throughout the night they tunnelled through areas of the debris to rescue the people trapped in the rubble. Muriel Maclean was found with her right leg mangled; she was rescued but died of her injuries a month later.

Inside the hotel, the Thatchers, Butler, several cabinet ministers with their partners and the Conservative secretarial staff who were still working, made their way downstairs and left the hotel through the rear entrance; they were taken to Brighton police station, which was thought the most secure place for them. Several other cabinet members were also taken to the police station, where Thatcher announced that the party conference would continue at 9:00 am. She, her husband and secretary spent the night at Lewes police college.

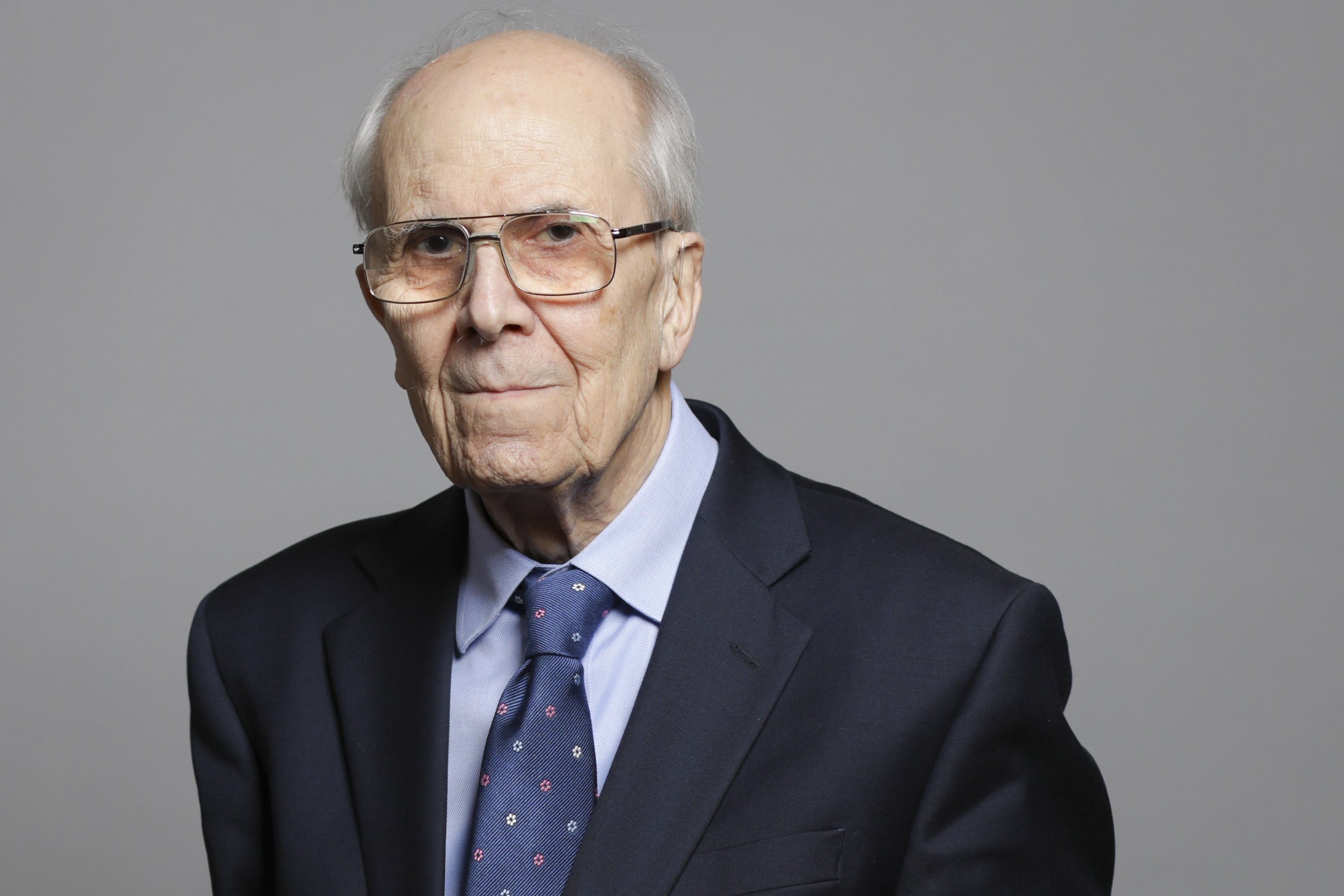
Norman Tebbit in 2020

After the explosion Tebbit and his wife ended up next to each other, twelve feet (3.7 m) above the hotel's reception, both alive but buried under tonnes of rubble; they held hands and talked to each other for comfort. Margaret was rescued first. She had a broken neck and was paralysed from the neck down; she had to use a wheelchair for the rest of her life because of her injuries. At 6:53 am Tebbit was finally taken out of the hotel in his pyjamas and on a stretcher; his extraction was caught on cameras as they were broadcasting live for breakfast television. The images, according to Carroll, "became a defining drama of the Brighton bomb". Tebbit had severe injuries to his ribs, shoulder and pelvis. The final casualty, John Wakeham, was extracted from under timber and rubble in the foyer, having fallen from the fourth floor. Casualties were lighter than the emergency services first expected; only thirty-three people were treated in hospital. Injuries included broken bones, lacerations and crush injuries.

Magee was staying with republican sympathisers in Cork; he heard the news of the explosion at 6:00 am. Writing in 2019 he recalled that "my immediate emotion was relief. Relief that the device had worked". That morning the IRA Army Council issued a statement:

The IRA claims responsibility for the detonation of 100lb of gelignite in Brighton against the British cabinet and Tory warmongers. Thatcher will now realise that Britain cannot occupy our country, torture our prisoners and shoot our people in their own streets and get away with it.

Today we were unlucky, but remember we have only to be lucky once, you will have to be lucky always. Give Ireland peace and there will be no war.

Many of the conference attendees had lost their clothes in the hotel. With the conference due to restart at 9:00 am that day, McAlpine hired a coach and several taxis to take them to a local branch of Marks & Spencer at 8:00 am, which he had arranged to be opened early for them. The Conservative Party paid for new clothes for them and had them back at the conference centre for it to open. Observing this, the BBC producer Ivor Gaber said, "If you ever want to understand how the Conservatives always win elections, you just watch the organisation." The conference started at 9:30 am with a standing ovation for Thatcher as she arrived on stage, followed by a two-minute silence. At 2:00 pm she gave her close-of-conference speech, which opened with comments on the bombing:

The bomb attack on the Grand Hotel early this morning was first and foremost an inhuman, undiscriminating attempt to massacre innocent unsuspecting men and women staying in Brighton for our Conservative Conference. ... [The bomb] was an attempt not only to disrupt and terminate our Conference; it was an attempt to cripple Her Majesty's democratically-elected Government. That is the scale of the outrage in which we have all shared, and the fact that we are gathered here now—shocked, but composed and determined—is a sign not only that this attack has failed, but that all attempts to destroy democracy by terrorism will fail.

== Reactions ==
The attack was condemned by world leaders. (Note: This included Chancellor Helmut Kohl of Germany, François Mitterrand of France, Ronald Reagan of the US, Bettino Craxi of Italy, Indira Gandhi of India, Gaston Thorn, the President of the European Commission, King Juan Carlos of Spain and Javier Pérez de Cuéllar, the Secretary-General of the United Nations.) This included denunciation from Garret FitzGerald, the taoiseach, who called the bombing "a gross miscalculation of the character of the British people and the nature of British democracy". Thatcher's decision to continue with the conference was supported by her domestic political opponents, including Neil Kinnock, leader of the Labour Party, David Steel of the Liberal Party and David Owen of the Social Democratic Party. Kinnock said "That is the way we must respond to such vile acts in this democracy. There can be no concessions to the murdering madness of those who commit crimes like this bombing." The political historians Ioana Emy Matesan and Ronit Berger consider that although there was some domestic condemnation, "overall the public condemnation was fairly weak". They suggest that "it seems as though since the target was the Conservative party, there was no widespread public condemnation and no rise in public fear of being targeted". The singer Morrissey commented "The only sorrow of the Brighton bombing is that Thatcher escaped unscathed." In 1998 the author and comedy scriptwriter John O'Farrell wrote "I felt a surge of excitement at the nearness of her demise and yet disappointment that such a chance had been missed. This was me—the pacifist, anti-capital-punishment, anti-IRA liberal—wishing that they had got her." The bombing was celebrated in some quarters. Republican prisoners in the Maze prison celebrated the news of the explosion with cheers of "Fuck Thatcher" and "Up the 'Ra". (Note: For supporters of Irish republicanism, "the 'Ra" is complimentary slang for "the IRA".)

The British press was mostly condemnatory of the attack. Caroll identifies xenophobic references in the reports, including The Sunday Express's rhetorical question "Wouldn't you rather admit to being a pig than to being Irish?" The Sun said the bombers "must be hunted remorselessly and exterminated like rats". An Phoblacht (The Republic)—the republican newspaper published by Sinn Féin, the political party associated with the IRA—ran the headline "IRA Blitz Brits". The bombing was front page news and appeared on news reports globally; most of the leading articles in newspapers were condemnatory of the attack, although some of those in countries hostile to Britain and Thatcher, such as North Korea, took the opportunity to attack her. The editorial in The Washington Post highlighted the possibility that the funds for the bombing may have come from US donors, and considered that "Americans of conscience must reject this violence and reject association with the killers whose cowardly acts of murder and mayhem are despised on both sides of the Atlantic". Similarly, the editorial of The New York Times stated "the IRA has turned overseas for support it cannot find in Dublin, playing on the gullibility of a small minority among the 40 million Americans of Irish descent". In an editorial condemnatory of the IRA and the bombing, The Irish Times focused on the ongoing talks between the British and Irish governments and wrote of their hope that "no bombs, no horrors, no attempts by nihilists to destroy the hope of peace, must be allowed to deflect the process".

== Investigation and Magee's actions, 12 October 1984 – 22 June 1985 ==
=== October 1984 to January 1985 ===
The investigation began at daybreak on the morning of 12 October, with police forensics teams examining the seafront and roadway directly in front of the hotel. They were unable to access the interior until the fire brigade had found the final missing guest. This turned out to be the body of Jeanne Shattock, which was located either in the evening of 12 October, or the following day. Police instructed the firemen to leave her body in situ as the location was a crime scene. Forensic teams went through the rubble, sifting and searching as they went. More than eight hundred long tons (810 t) of rubble was collected in nearly 3,800 plastic dustbins and sent to the Royal Armament Research and Development Establishment at Fort Halstead, Kent. Once there, it was sieved again and forensically analysed.

In the basement of the hotel, the police located the registration cards of the previous guests of the hotel; pre-computerisation of the booking system, these were the only records of those who had stayed at the Grand. After two weeks of searching, a part of the Memo Park timer was located in the U-bend of the toilet in room 329. The police searches of the hotel lasted until 30 October. The Anti-Terrorist Branch of the police informed the investigation team of an IRA cache found in Salcey Forest which had a missing timer that was possibly set to twenty-four days, six hours and thirty-six minutes. The cache had been found in January 1984 in buried dustbins that contained arms and bomb-making equipment. The haul included submachine guns, handguns, grenades, ArmaLite ammunition, mercury tilt switches and six long-delay timers, numbered between one and seven, with number four missing. All were pre-set for the same length delay. This would have meant placing the bomb on 17 September. Looking at the registration cards for the four rooms at the epicentre of the explosion—rooms 528, 529, 628 and 629—for that day, they investigated the people who had stayed on that date and established that the card for Roy Walsh showed a false name. The registration card was fingerprinted and showed a partial palm print; in January 1985 this matched with prints taken for Magee when he had been arrested in Norwich in 1967. (Note: Magee was arrested when he was fifteen for breaking into a butcher's equipment business in Norwich; he spent a year in a probation hostel in London.)

=== January to June 1985 ===
With no knowledge of where Magee was, the information that he was the bomber was kept secret within the investigation team. Surveillance by the RUC Special Branch and the Garda Síochána on Magee's wife—the RUC while she was still in Northern Ireland; the Gardaí when she crossed the border to the Republic—had located Magee in Ballymun, an outer suburb in the north of Dublin. Rather than request extradition to the UK, the British government, police and security services decided to wait until Magee returned to the UK. The British government chose not to tell their Irish counterparts that Magee was the bomber, but instead had the police ask the Gardaí to keep him under surveillance.

In 1985 the IRA planned a series of bomb attacks in British tourist destinations, mainly seaside resorts, over the summer period. The aim was to have sixteen bombs explode within fourteen days. Magee volunteered to be included in the group. (Note: The selection was: Brighton on 19 July; Dover and Ramsgate on 20 July; London on 22 July; Blackpool on 23 July; London, again, on 24 July; Eastbourne on 25 July; London, again, on 26 July; Bournemouth on 27 July; London for a fourth time on 29 July; Torquay on 30 July; Great Yarmouth on 31 July; Folkestone on 1 August; Margate on 2 August; Southend-on-Sea on 3 August; and Southampton on 5 August.) A team of four was formed: Magee; Gerry McDonnell, who was experienced with electronics and had operated in England previously; Martina Anderson, who had been charged with causing an explosion in 1981; and Ella O'Dwyer, a newcomer to the IRA's active service who had joined their cause because of the hunger strikes.

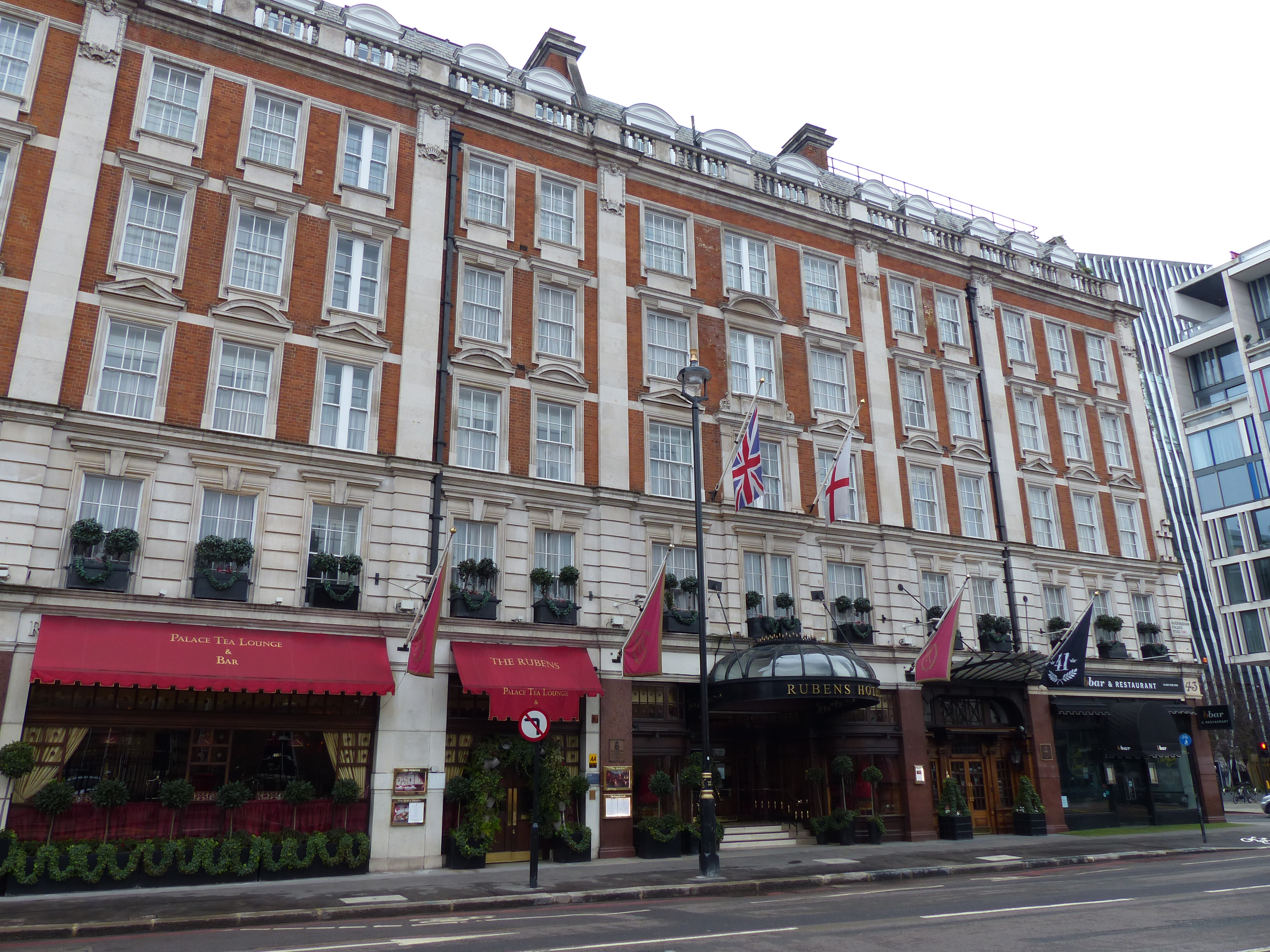
The Rubens Hotel, opposite the Royal Mews, London

In March 1985 Magee gave the Garda surveillance team the slip and travelled to Britain where he and O'Dwyer rented a flat in Glasgow. On 15 June he and a female partner rented a room at the Rubens Hotel, overlooking the Royal Mews, which is situated on the grounds of Buckingham Palace. (Note: Carroll considers it is likely that this was O'Dwyer.) They rented room 112 for £70 for one night and planted a pre-assembled bomb that comprised 3 pounds 9 ounces (1.6 kg) of gelignite, set with a long delay timer to explode at 1:00 pm on 29 July. It was placed behind the bedside table, which had to be unscrewed from the wall for the device to be placed, and then screwed back in place. Soon after Magee rented a flat in Hackney Road to use as the England Department's base in London.

In June 1985 the RUC undertook surveillance on Peter Sherry, the commander of the East Tyrone Brigade. He was followed from his home in Dungannon to Belfast docks, where a tip-off to police had alerted them that a member of the IRA was to be smuggled over to mainland Britain. The surveillance was picked up in Ayr, Scotland, by special branch officers from Strathclyde Police who were joined by a small detachment of RUC officers who had been trailing Sherry. He travelled to Carlisle where he stayed overnight. As he was now in England, Strathclyde Police had no jurisdiction; they contacted the Special Branch of the Metropolitan Police who travelled overnight to Carlisle. The following day, 22 June 1985, Sherry went to the railway station where he met Magee, who had travelled from London. Magee was immediately identified by the surveillance team. A decision was made not to arrest the two men immediately, but to continue following them as the pair returned to the rented flat in Langside, Glasgow, where the rest of the England Department ASU were staying.

== Arrest and trial ==
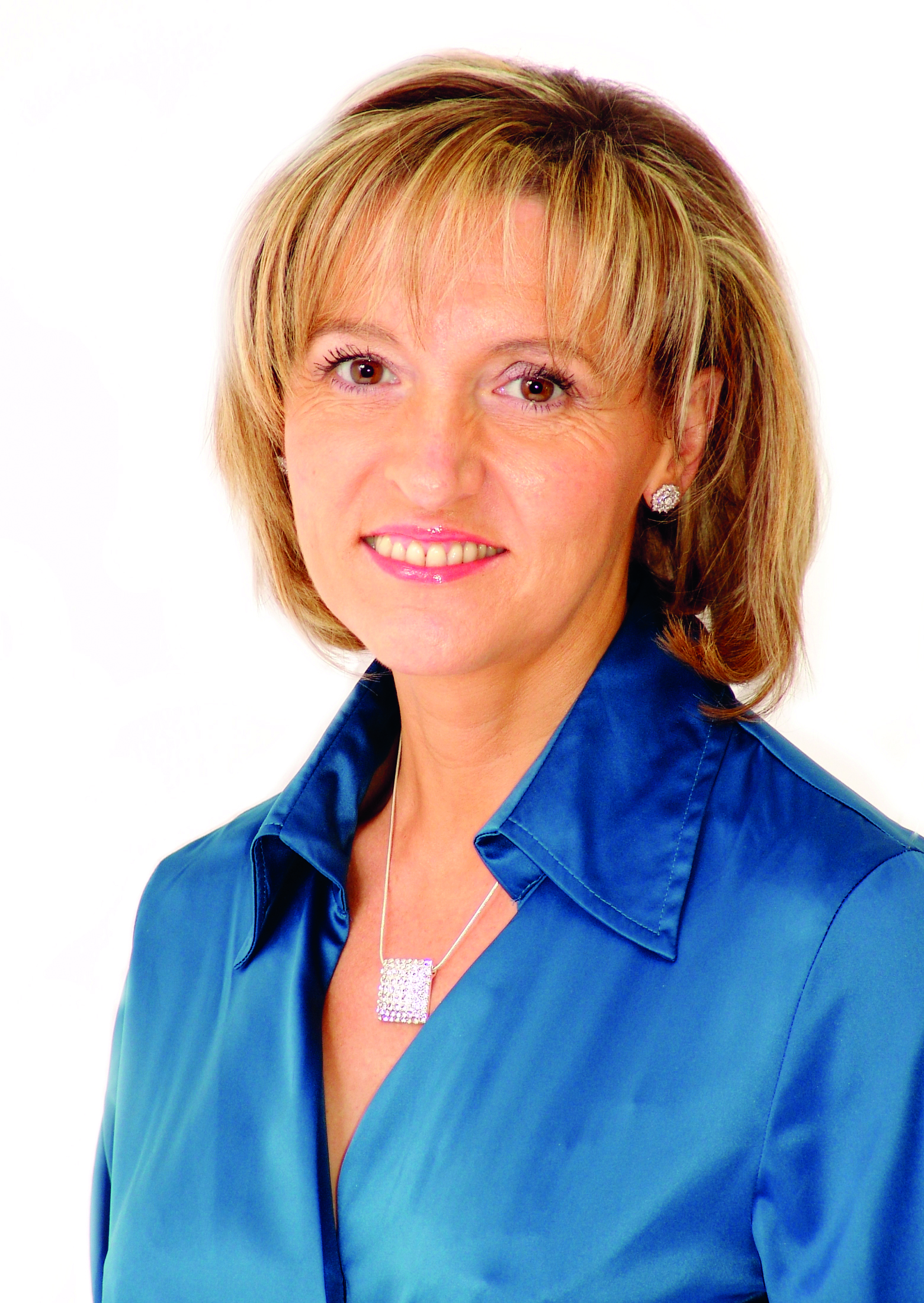
Martina Anderson was one of those arrested with Magee

The police decided to raid the Langside property, although it was not known which of the building's eight flats the men were in. It was decided that all eight flats were to be raided at the same time, with two officers assigned per flat, at least one of whom should be armed, with other officers on standby to assist. At about 7:00 pm on 22 June 1985, all the doors in the premises were knocked on. On the ground floor Magee and his compatriots were expecting the landlord to come round for the rent. As Magee answered the door he was arrested; other policemen entered the premises and arrested the four other IRA members present: Sherry, McDonnell, O'Dwyer and Anderson.

When searching McDonnell, police found the list of cities in which the England ASU had been intending to plant bombs. A tick was next to the first entry, which read "London, 1st floor, 112, front, The Rubens Hotel, Buckingham Palace Road. BT plus 48". Also found was a schematic of the device, which showed "BT" meant booby trap. The device was soon found and disabled.

The trial of Magee, McDonnell, Sherry, Anderson and O'Dwyer opened on 6 May 1986 and lasted until 11 June. Also included with the accused was Shaun McShane, an IRA sympathiser who had assisted the England Department with providing premises where they could stay; he was charged with aiding and abetting.

During the trial the police were accused of planting a firearm on McDonnell. It had been, the police claimed, in McDonnell's waistband when he was arrested; he denied it was his. No fingerprints were found on the weapon. Police denied they had planted evidence on him. The police were also accused of planting Magee's palmprint on the hotel registration card, which they denied. Magee reiterated the claim in 2000, saying "If that was my fingerprint I did not put it there". Sherry, McDonnell, Anderson and O'Dwyer were sentenced to life imprisonment. McShane was sentenced to eight years; this was reduced to six years on appeal. Magee was sentenced to eight life sentences, to be run concurrently, with the recommendation that he serve at least thirty-five years before being considered for parole. After the verdict was announced, Magee spoke his only words of the trial: "Tiocfaidh ár lá" ("Our day will come").

== Repercussions and legacy ==
In the early 1980s, and prior to the Brighton bomb, there were several assassinations or assassination attempts in London. (Note: These were the successful assassinations on Mustafa Mohammed Ramadan, a Libyan journalist and Mahmoud Abbu Nafa, a Libyan lawyer. There were also unsuccessful attempts on the British general Steuart Pringle; Michael Havers, the Attorney General for England and Wales and Attorney General for Northern Ireland; Shlomo Argov the Israeli ambassador to the UK; and Rahmi Gümrükçüoğlu, the Turkish ambassador to the UK. The historian Simon Ball identifies the origin of the assassins as Armenian, Iraqi, Irish, Israeli, Libyan and Palestinian.) The rise in such attempts, and the events at Brighton, changed the approach taken by the British government to turn Britain into a "permanent counter-assassination state", according to the historian Simon Ball. The previously relaxed view of Special Branch close protection officers had already been under review prior to Brighton, and a new bodyguard system was implemented by Thatcher a few days after the bombing. In the House of Commons debate on the bomb, Leon Brittan, the home secretary, said:

Total security is impossible in a free, democratic society. Political and other leaders are vulnerable because they must be accessible. Everything that can be done will be done to prevent such outrages and to protect their targets. But we will not be bombed into boltholes by terrorists.

Measures were brought in to protect prominent politicians, including permanent security after they had left office. Special Branch provided more than a hundred officers for government and diplomatic protection to counter threats and assassination attempts, which cost the Metropolitan Police £59 million a year in 1993. (Note: £59 million in 1993 equates to approximately £127 million in 2025, according to calculations based on the Consumer Price Index measure of inflation.) The journalist David Hughes, who was covering the Brighton conference for The Daily Telegraph writes that the bomb, and the subsequent changes in security provision "marked the end of an age of comparative innocence. From that day forward, all party conferences in this country have become heavily defended citadels".

In addition to historical news coverage, the Brighton bomb has been described in books, including histories of what happened and personal memoirs from those involved. The events have also been depicted in music, film and fiction, (Note: These include: "Brighton Bomb", a single released in 1986 by the punk band Angelic Upstarts.; The 2004 play The Bomb by Kevin Dyer.; The 2005 play Talking to Terrorists by Robin Soans.; The 2011 film The Iron Lady.; Adrian McKinty's 2014 novel In the Morning I'll Be Gone, the third novel in "Troubles Trilogy".; Jonathan Lee's 2015 novel High Dive, a fictionalised account of the bombing.; The 2015 play The Bombing of the Grand Hotel by Julie Everton and Josie Melia.) and been examined in television documentaries. (Note: These include: The Brighton Bomber (1986); To Kill the Cabinet (1986); The Brighton Bomb (2003; part of the Secret History series); The Brighton Bomb (2004); The Hunt for the Bomber (2004); The Brighton Bombing (2007))

=== Northern Ireland policy ===
Despite the bombing, Thatcher did not call off the ongoing talks with the Irish government. She saw these as important in stopping the political support for Sinn Féin in favour of the constitutional—and peaceful—nationalism of the Social Democratic and Labour Party. Instead she slowed the process and rejected some aspects under negotiation, as she did not want to give the impression that the bomb had resulted in any weakening of the British negotiating position. The bomb, however, left a deep impression on Thatcher and demonstrated that a solution to the violence needed to be found.

In the opinion of the political scientist Feargal Cochrane, the bomb acted as "a catalyst" for the discussions that led to the signing of the Anglo-Irish Agreement on 15 November 1985, despite opposition from within Thatcher's own party. The agreement gave the Irish government an advisory role in Northern Ireland's government while confirming that there would be no change in the constitutional position of Northern Ireland unless a majority of its citizens voted to join the Republic.

=== Magee's release ===
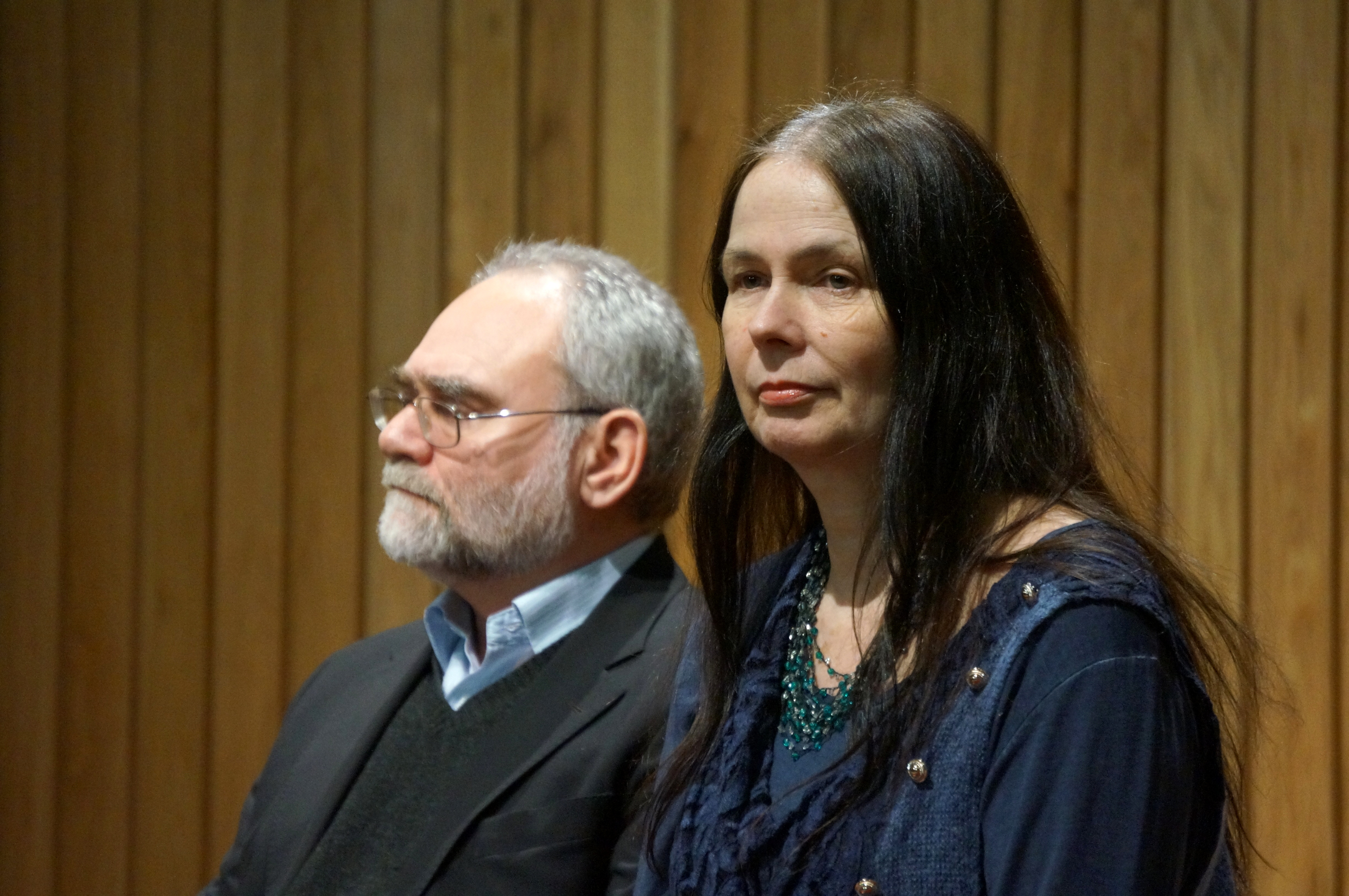
Patrick Magee (left) and Jo Berry (right) at a peace-building event in Belfast

In 1997 Magee's sentence was changed to a whole life order, meaning he would never be released from prison. This was later quashed as part of the Good Friday Agreement and Magee was released under licence in June 1999, despite a challenge by Jack Straw, the home secretary, to stop it. The Independent Sentence Review Commission—the body that decided whether paramilitaries should be released—endorsed his discharge.

In 2000 Magee and Jo Berry, the daughter of Sir Anthony Berry, met at Berry's request; she wanted to understand the conflict from Magee's perspective. Magee described it as "a moment of profound significance to me". He said that about halfway through their three-hour talk:

the goodness and intelligence and value I perceived in this woman must in some measure have come from her father. And I had killed him. I had killed a fine human being. It had evidently been more comfortable for me to live with the perception that as a Tory he was simply the enemy, a warmonger, driven by greed, without a personal moral code or a rounded background. I too was guilty of demonising the enemy.

The two met again several times and became friends, giving talks together at reconciliation events; in 2009 they formed the organisation Building Bridges for Peace, which aimed to bring divided communities together through dialogue.

== See also ==
- List of bombings during the Troubles
  - Downing Street mortar attack, failed assassination attempt against Prime Minister John Major
- Assassination of Spencer Perceval

== Notes and references ==
=== Sources ===
==== Books ====
- Aitken, Jonathan (2013). Margaret Thatcher: Power and Personality. New York: Bloomsbury. ISBN 978-1-62040-342-6.
- Bell, J. Bowyer (1993). The Irish Troubles: A Generation of Violence, 1967–1992. New York: St. Martin's Press. ISBN 978-0-3120-8827-9.
- Bell, J. Bowyer (2000). The IRA, 1968–2000: Analysis of a Secret Army. London: Frank Cass. ISBN 978-1-1363-3308-8.
- Bishop, Patrick; Mallie, Eamonn (1987). The Provisional IRA. London: Heinemman. ISBN 978-0-4340-7410-5.
- Bret, David (2004). Morrissey: Scandal & Passion. London: Robson. ISBN 978-1-8610-5968-0.
- Carroll, Rory (2023). Killing Thatcher. London: HarperCollins Publishers Limited. ISBN 978-0-0084-7666-3.
- Cochrane, Feargal (2021). Northern Ireland: The Fragile Peace. New Haven, Connecticut: Yale University Press. ISBN 978-0-3002-0552-7.
- Coogan, Tim Pat (1994). The IRA: A History. Niwot, Colorado: Roberts Rinehart Publishers. ISBN 978-1-8793-7399-0.
- Coogan, Tim Pat (2002). The Troubles: Ireland's Ordeal, 1966–1996 and the Search for Peace. New York: Palgrave for St. Martin's Press. ISBN 978-0-3122-9418-2.
- Dawson, Graham (2017). "Introduction". In van Leeuwen, Sacha; Dawson, Graham (eds.). The Brighton 'Grand Hotel' Bombing: History, Memory and Political Theatre (PDF). Brighton, East Sussex: Centre for Research in Memory, Narrative and Histories, University of Brighton. pp. 1–10. OCLC 1090426341.
- English, Richard (2003). Armed Struggle: The History of the IRA. Oxford: Oxford University Press. ISBN 978-0-1951-6605-7.
- Everton, Julie; Melia, Josie (2017). "The Writing, Production and Reception of The Bombing of the Grand Hotel". In van Leeuwen, Sacha; Dawson, Graham (eds.). The Brighton 'Grand Hotel' Bombing: History, Memory and Political Theatre (PDF). Brighton, East Sussex: Centre for Research in Memory, Narrative and Histories, University of Brighton. pp. 59–68. OCLC 1090426341.
- Hennessey, Thomas (2014). Hunger Strike: Margaret Thatcher's Battle with the IRA, 1980–81. Newbridge, Co. Kildare: Irish Academic Press. ISBN 978-0-7165-3176-0.
- Hughes, Kieran (2014). Terror Attack Brighton: Blowing Up the Iron Lady. Barnsley, South Yorkshire: Pen & Sword Politics. ISBN 978-1-4738-2329-7.
- Kelly, Stephen (2021). Margaret Thatcher, the Conservative Party and the Northern Ireland Conflict, 1975–1990. London: Bloomsbury Academic. ISBN 978-1-3501-1537-8.
- Magee, Patrick (2021). Where Grieving Begins: Building Bridges After the Brighton Bomb. London: Pluto Press. ISBN 978-0-7453-4177-4.
- McConaghy, Kieran (2017). Terrorism and the State: Intra-state Dynamics and the Response to Non-state Political Violence. London: Palgrave Macmillan. ISBN 978-1-1375-7266-0.
- McGladdery, Gary (2006). The Provisional IRA in England: The Bombing Campaign, 1973–1997. Dublin: Irish Academic Press. ISBN 978-0-7165-3373-3.
- Moloney, Ed (2003). A Secret History of the IRA. London: Penguin. ISBN 978-0-14-101041-0.
- Moore, Charles (2013). Margaret Thatcher: The Authorized Biography. Vol. Two: Everything She Wants. New York: Alfred A. Knopf. ISBN 978-0-3079-5894-5.
- Mulholland, Marc (2012). "'Just another country'? The Irish question in the Thatcher years". In Jackson, Ben; Saunders, Robert (eds.). Making Thatcher's Britain. Cambridge: Cambridge University Press. pp. 180–196. ISBN 978-0-5119-9816-4.
- O'Donnell, Ruan (2012). Special Category: The IRA in English Prisons. Dublin: Irish Academic Press. ISBN 978-0-7165-3141-8.
- O'Farrell, John (1998). Things Can Only Get Better: Eighteen Miserable Years in the Life of a Labour Supporter, 1979–1997. London: Doubleday. ISBN 978-0-3854-1059-5.
- O'Malley, Padraig (1990). Biting at the Grave: The Irish Hunger Strikes and the Politics of Despair. Boston, Massachusetts: Beacon Press. ISBN 978-0-8070-0209-4.
- Oppenheimer, A. R. (2009). IRA, the Bombs and the Bullets: A History of Deadly Ingenuity. Dublin: Irish Academic Press. ISBN 978-0-7165-2894-4.
- Ramsey, Steve A. (2018). Something Has Gone Wrong: Dealing with the Brighton Bomb. London: Biteback Publishing. ISBN 978-1-7859-0336-6.
- Revill, James (2016). Improvised Explosive Devices: The Paradigmatic Weapon of New Wars. London: Palgrave Macmillan. ISBN 978-3-3193-3833-0.
- Stern, Chester (1997). Dr Iain West's Casebook. London: Warner. ISBN 978-0-7515-1846-7.
- Strong, M. C. (1995). The Great Rock Discography. Edinburgh: Canongate. ISBN 978-0-8624-1541-9.
- Taylor, Peter (1998). Provos: The IRA and Sinn Fein. London: Bloomsbury. ISBN 978-0-7475-3818-9.
- Tebbit, Norman (1989). Upwardly Mobile. London: Futura. ISBN 978-0-7088-4392-5.
- Thatcher, Margaret (1993). The Downing Street Years. London: HarperCollins. ISBN 978-0-0025-5049-9.

==== Journals and magazines ====
- Ball, Simon (March 2019). "The State and the Assassination Threat in Britain" (PDF). The Historical Journal. 62 (1): 241–265. doi:10.1017/S0018246X17000401.
- English, Richard (July 2013). "Terrorist Innovation and International Politics: Lessons from an IRA Case Study?". International Politics. 50 (4): 496–511. doi:10.1057/ip.2013.18.
- Matesan, Ioana Emy; Berger, Ronit (4 May 2017). "Blunders and Blame: How Armed Non-State Actors React to Their Mistakes". Studies in Conflict & Terrorism. 40 (5): 376–398. doi:10.1080/1057610X.2016.1210891.
- O'Brien, Kevin A. (October 2008). "Assessing Hostile Reconnaissance and Terrorist Intelligence Activities: The Case for a Counter Strategy". The RUSI Journal. 153 (5): 34–39. doi:10.1080/03071840802521903.
- Walker, C. P. (1984). "Irish Republican Prisoners – Political Detainees, Prisoners of War or Common Criminals?". Irish Jurist. 19 (2): 189–225. ISSN 0021-1273. JSTOR 44027778.

==== Legislation ====
- "Northern Ireland Troubles (Legacy and Reconciliation) Act 2023: Section 1(1)(a)". The National Archives. 2023.

==== News ====
- "Body Clue to Seat of Bomb in Hotel". The Times. 13 May 1986. p. 3.
- "Brighton". The Irish Times. 13 October 1984. p. 19.
- Burke, Declan (18 January 2014). "Gripping RUC Thriller has Troubles in Mind". Irish Examiner.
- Cavendish, Dominic (20 October 2008). "The Bomb". The Daily Telegraph. p. 26.
- Goodman, Lee-Ann (13 October 2007). "Tube Talk". Waterloo Region Record. p. 32.
- "Gun was Planted, Bombs Trial Told". The Times. 16 May 1986. p. 3.
- Hattenstone, Simon (10 December 2001). "Bombs and Books". The Guardian.
- Hoggart, Paul (16 May 2003). "Secret History was a Sobering Reminder of a Terrorist Attack that Could Have Changed the Course of British History". The Times. p. 23.
- Hughes, David (11 October 2009). "Brighton Bombing: Daily Telegraph Journalist Recalls". The Daily Telegraph. Archived from the original on 25 December 2011.
- "IRA Blitz Brits". An Phoblacht. 18 October 1984. p. 1.
- "Ireland's Possessed". The New York Times. 13 October 1984. p. 26.
- "Lady Tebbit; Nurse and Loyal Political Spouse Left Paralysed After the IRA Bombing of the Grand Hotel, Brighton". The Daily Telegraph. 22 December 2020. p. 35.
- Linton, Martin (13 October 1984). "Thatcher Right to Carry On, Says Kinnock". The Guardian. p. 3.
- Moore, Charles (2 December 2011). "Margaret Thatcher: A Figure of History and Legend". The Daily Telegraph. Archived from the original on 12 January 2022.
- "Outrage as Brighton Bomber Freed". BBC News. 22 June 1999.
- "Police Framed Man for Tory Bomb, QC Says". The Times. 4 June 1986. p. 3.
- Senior, Jennifer (14 March 2016). "Review: Jonathan Lee's 'High Dive' Revisits a Plot to Kill Margaret Thatcher". The New York Times.
- Tendler, Stewart (6 May 1986a). "Security Tight in Bomb Trial". The Times. p. 3.
- Tendler, Stewart (10 May 1986b). "Bomb Part 'Found in Hotel Lavatory'". The Times. p. 3.
- Tendler, Stewart (11 June 1986c). "Magee Guilty of Brighton Hotel Bomb". The Times. p. 1.
- Tendler, Stewart (24 June 1986d). "35 Years' Jail for 'Inhuman' IRA Bomber". The Times. p. 1.
- Tendler, Stewart (15 March 1993). "VIPs Force Yard to Abandon Plan for Cheaper Protection". The Times. p. 2.
- "The Brighton Bombing". The Washington Post. 14 October 1984. p. D6.
- "UDA Murder Plot Accused Anton Duffy Met IRA 'Helper'". BBC News. 1 June 2015.
- Webster, Philip (13 October 1984). "Leaders Support Decision to Carry on with Conference". The Times. p. 3.
- Wilson, Jamie (28 August 2000). "Brighton Bomber Thinks Again". The Guardian.

==== Websites ====
- "About Building Bridges for Peace". Building Bridges for Peace. 22 March 2021. Archived from the original on 16 June 2024.
- Brittan, Leon (22 October 1984). "Bomb Incident (Brighton)". Parliamentary Debates (Hansard). House of Commons. col. 440–441. Archived from the original on 12 June 2024.
- "CAIN: FAQ". CAIN Archive. Ulster University. Archived from the original on 6 December 2010.
- Clark, Gregory (2023). "The Annual RPI and Average Earnings for Britain, 1209 to Present (New Series)". MeasuringWorth. Archived from the original on 1 April 2023.
- Fitzduff, Mari; O'Hagan, Liam (2009). "The Northern Ireland Troubles: INCORE background paper". CAIN Archive. Ulster University. Archived from the original on 9 July 2024.
- Maume, Patrick (August 2012). "Sands, Robert ('Bobby')". Dictionary of Irish Biography. Archived from the original on 20 June 2024.
- Thatcher, Margaret (21 April 1981). "Press Conference Ending Visit to Saudi Arabia". Margaret Thatcher Foundation. Archived from the original on 20 June 2024.
- Thatcher, Margaret (12 October 1984). "Speech to Conservative Party Conference". Margaret Thatcher Foundation. Archived from the original on 1 June 2024.
- "The Brighton Bomb". BBC Genome. 14 September 2004. Archived from the original on 22 July 2024.
- "The Hunt for the Bomber". BBC Genome. 14 September 2004. Archived from the original on 7 June 2024.
- "Types of Prison Sentence". UK Government. Archived from the original on 16 June 2024.
