= Chhut-thâu-thiⁿ =

Taiwanese slogan

Chhut-thâu-thiⁿ (Chinese: 出頭天; pinyin: chūtóutiān) is a slogan in the Taiwanese language of the Taiwan independence movement and its sympathizers. The literal translation is roughly ‘lift up [your] heads towards the sky’ or ‘[we shall] emerge with only the sky above [our] heads’, which means something like ‘we shall have our day’. A similar slogan in Irish republicanism is ‘Tiocfaidh ár lá’; and in South Africa, the call–response ‘Amandla! – Ngawethu!’

An early use of this phrase appeared in the second chapter ‘Sin Tâi-ôan kap Lô-má-jī ê Koan-hē’ (‘A new Taiwan and its relationship with Latinized orthography’) of Chhoà Pôe-hóe's 1925 book Cha̍p-hāng Koán-kiàn (‘Ten Humble Opinions’).

The phrase is also associated with Taiwanese nativist Christian theological currents of the 1970s, most notably Chhut-thâu-thiⁿ Theology.
