= Matteo Bonotti =

Italian political theorist

Academic background
- Education: University of Edinburgh
- Thesis: Pluralism and Moderation in an Inclusive Political Realm: A Normative Defence of Religious Political Parties
- Doctoral advisor: Lynn Dobson; Wilfried Swensen

Academic work
- Era: 21st century
- Discipline: Politics
- Sub-discipline: Political theory
- School or tradition: Analytic political philosophy
- Institutions: Queen's University Belfast, Cardiff University, Monash University

Matteo Bonotti is an Italian political theorist. He is an associate professor at Monash University in Australia, where he teaches in the Department of Politics and International Relations. His research areas include political parties, freedom of speech, food policy, and language policy.

== Career ==
Bonotti was educated at Liceo Classico P.A. Guglielmotti in Civitavecchia before reading for a laurea in philosophy at Sapienza University of Rome from 1998 to 2003. From 2004 to 2005, he read for a Master of Science degree in International and European Politics at the University of Edinburgh, before completing a PhD in Politics at the same institution between 2006 and 2010. His doctoral thesis, supervised by Lynn Dobson and Wilfried Swensen, was entitled Pluralism and Moderation in an Inclusive Political Realm: A Normative Defence of Religious Political Parties. Between 2009 and 2013, Bonotti taught variously at the University of the West of Scotland, Stevenson College Edinburgh, the University of Stirling, and the University of Edinburgh, before moving to Queen's University Belfast in 2013, where he took up a post as Lecturer in Political Theory. He moved to Cardiff University in 2015, the same year that he published his first book, Parties, Partisanship and Political Theory, which was co-edited with Veit Bader. Bonotti remained a lecturer in Political Theory at Cardiff until 2017, when he took up the position of a lecturer at Monash University.

That year, Bonotti published his first monograph, Partisanship and Political Liberalism in Diverse Societies, which was the subject of a symposium in the journal Philosophy and Public Issues, guest-edited by Enrico Biale and Giulia Bistagnino. Bonotti's second monograph, Brexit, Language Policy and Linguistic Diversity, coauthored with Diarmait Mac Giolla Chríost, was published the following year. In 2020, he became a Senior Lecturer at Monash. He published three books in 2021: A Century of Compulsory Voting in Australia: Genesis, Impact and Future, co-edited with Paul Strangio; Recovering Civility during COVID-19 (an open access book), co-authored with Steven T. Zech, which was the subject of a symposium in the journal Notizie di Politeia; and Free Speech, co-authored with Jonathan Seglow. The following year, he published Healthy Eating Policy and Political Philosophy: A Public Reason Approach with Anne Barnhill, which was the subject of symposia in the journals Food Ethics and the Critical Review of International Social and Political Philosophy. In 2024, Bonotti published Australian Politics at a Crossroads, which was co-edited with Narelle Miragliotta, and was promoted to associate professor at Monash. The following year, he published Gastrospaces: A Philosophical Study of Where We Eat, which was coauthored with Andrea Borghini, Nicola Piras, and Beatrice Serini, and Money, Parties, and Democracy: Political Finance Between Fat Cats and Big Government, co-authored with Zim Nwokora. In 2026, he published Diasporas, Voting and Linguistic Justice: A Study of Second- and Third-Generation Italo-Australians, co-authored with Chiara De Lazzari and Narelle Miragliotta.

== Select bibliography ==
Recovering Civility during COVID-19 and Diasporas, Voting and Linguistic Justice, two open access books coauthored by Bonotti
- Bonotti, Matteo; Bader, Viet, eds. (2015). Parties, Partisanship and Political Theory. Abingdon: Routledge.
- Bonotti, Matteo (2017). Partisanship and Political Liberalism in Diverse Societies. Oxford: Oxford University Press.
- Chríost, Diarmait Mac Giolla (2018). Brexit, Language Policy and Linguistic Diversity. Cham: Palgrave Pivot.
- Bonotti, Matteo; Strangio, Paul, eds. (2021). A Century of Compulsory Voting in Australia: Genesis, Impact and Future. Singapore: Palgrave Macmillan.
- Bonotti, Matteo; Zech, Steven T. (2021). Recovering Civility during COVID-19. Singapore: Palgrave Macmillan.
- Bonotti, Matteo; Seglow, Jonathan (2021). Free Speech. Cambridge: Polity.
- Barnhill, Anne; Bonotti, Matteo (2022). Healthy Eating Policy and Political Philosophy: A Public Reason Approach. New York: Oxford University Press.
- Bonotti, Matteo; Miragliotta, Narelle, eds. (2024). Australian Politics at a Crossroads: Prospects for Change. Abingdon: Routledge.
- Bonotti, Matteo; Borghini, Andrea; Piras, Nicola; Serini, Beatrice (2025). Gastrospaces: A Philosophical Study of Where We Eat. Abingdon: Routledge.
- Bonotti, Matteo; Nwokora, Zim (2025). Money, Parties, and Democracy: Political Finance Between Fat Cats and Big Government. Oxford: Oxford University Press.
- Bonotti, Matteo; De Lazzari, Chiara; Miragliotta, Narelle (2026). Diasporas, Voting and Linguistic Justice: A Study of Second- and Third-Generation Italo-Australians. Springer.
