= The Aurum Film Encyclopedia =

The Aurum Film Encyclopedia is a multi-volume reference work on cinema, published in the UK by Aurum Press and edited by Phil Hardy.

== Content ==
The first volume, devoted to western films, appeared in 1983, with eight subsequent volumes announced at that time as "forthcoming". However, only three additional entries were issued. All four volumes have been published in the U.S. by The Overlook Press, with the same contents as the UK editions but with the title changed to The Overlook Film Encyclopedia.

The Foreword to all four volumes is the same, describing the proposed nine-volume encyclopedia as "covering the principal film categories or genres which have developed since the birth of the industry." The intent was to produce a "complete and authoritative" body of information that, upon completion, would be seen as "a truly comprehensive and enduring reference guide to the fabulous world of film."

Each book provides a decade by decade overview of that volume's respective genre. Capsule reviews of individual films are provided per year of release. Each year's films are listed alphabetically, and feature brief cast and credit details.

Tim Lucas described the first three volumes as "essential reference tools" and "eminently collectable as a set."

== Volume One ==
Volume 1: UK Edition

Published in 1983, The Aurum Film Encyclopedia: The Western is a chronological history of the genre from 1930 - 1983. The book is credited solely to Phil Hardy, and all reviews are ostensibly his work alone. All subsequent volumes credit Hardy as editor, and provide a list of the contributing reviewers on the main title page. Hardy made the decision not to include any silent films in this first volume because, as he explained in his Preface, "space is at a premium" and "only a few silent Westerns are available for viewing." In addition, hundreds of “minor” sound westerns were not included in the main text, again because of noted space issues; the titles of all excluded sound films are provided in a massive, 20-page appendix entitled "All Other Sound Westerns". Many serials and Italian westerns are relegated to this appendix. No such listing is provided for the missing silent films. Other appendices include a list of the top box office western hits, top ten lists from critics, and all Academy Award-winning westerns. Sixteen pages of color stills are provided in a center insert.

A second edition of the book was published in 1991, with its chronology expanded through 1990 and a different set of appendices. Ten pages were added to the new edition, covering the few films produced during the years 1984 - 1990. This edition was reprinted in 1995. The color section was omitted.

== Volume Two ==
Volume II: UK Edition

Published in 1984, The Aurum Film Encyclopedia: Science Fiction, followed the history of the genre chronologically, from 1897 – 1983. Unlike the previous volume, silent genre titles are included, and even minor genre films are reviewed in the main text. Also unlike the first volume, Hardy mentions the names of the various critics who provided the reviews in the text, which in this book were Denis Gifford, Anthony Masters, Paul Taylor, and Paul Willemen. However, none of the film reviews are signed, so it is not possible to determine what material each writer contributed to the book. Like the first, this volume includes supplemental material including all-time box-office hits, critics’ top ten lists and all science fiction films that have won Academy Awards. The book includes sixteen pages of color stills in a center insert.

Tim Lucas wrote of the first edition that "no self-respecting film library should be without it", and further noted that it was "particularly recommended for its coverage of the early silent trick films - perhaps the most complete document of its kind ever published."

An expanded second edition was published in 1995, with new entries on all films that had received a theatrical release through 1994. Longer by 62 pages than the original version, the edition dropped most of the appendices due to space issues as well as the color section.

== Volume Three ==
Volume III: U.S. Edition

Published in 1984, The Aurum Film Encyclopedia: Horror, provides a chronological history of the horror film since its inception in 1896 through 1983. Like the science fiction volume, all known theatrically released films, including those from the silent era, have entries. More than either of the two previous books, the horror volume is international in scope, providing coverage of all films from all countries that have ever produced a horror-related title. The contributors to this volume were Tom Milne, Paul Willemen, Verina Glaessner (her credit was removed from the second edition), Julian Petley, and Tim Pulleine. The writers' specific contributions are not possible to determine, as none of the film reviews are signed. Sixteen pages of color stills are featured in a center insert. In 1987, it was published in an edition titled The Encyclopedia of Horror Movies: The Complete Film Reference.

Tim Lucas has acclaimed the first edition as "the greatest and most influential of all books on the subject". In a later review, he described the book as "an intoxicating road map to further study and the enthusiasms of its authors(...)planted the seeds for the rediscovery and reappraisal of such cinéastes as Jesús Franco, José Mojica Marins, Pupi Avati, and Jean Rollin...Hardy's hefty tome redefined how horror cinema was perceived by its admirers more so than any other single work..."

An expanded second edition was published in 1993, with new entries on all films released through 1992. This edition is approximately 90 pages longer than the first, with three of the appendices dropped for space reasons. As noted by Hardy in his Preface to the updated edition, Kim Newman wrote nearly all of the book's new material. This second edition was reprinted in 1995. Tim Lucas felt the second edition would probably disappoint many readers as it was not "as rich in international selection this time around", concentrating mainly on films produced in the United States and United Kingdom. In addition, as stated in the preface, it dropped its reviews of two 1970s films: Don't Look in the Basement and Kiss of the Tarantula. The new material can easily be recognized by a slightly lighter typeface. Newly added are entries on Let's Scare Jessica to Death, Blood Waters of Dr. Z, Curse of Bigfoot, Don't Look Now, King Kong, Dawn of the Dead, and all of the updated material from 1985 to 1992. On comparing the two versions, Don't Look in the Basement was replaced with Don't Look Now (273) and Kiss of the Tarantula was replaced with King Kong (314-315). A redundant entry for Crypt of the Living Dead under 1972 was replaced with Curse of Bigfoot (249), having already been covered as 1973's La Tumba de la isla maldita on page 285 of both editions. Blood Waters of Dr. Z replaced a second review of Ivan Reitman's Cannibal Girls, which was already covered with a different review on page 229 of both editions (247). Let's Scare Jessica to Death replaced an image from The Mephisto Waltz (236). Dawn of the Dead was erroneously placed in 1979, removing an image from The Driller Killer (335). Pages 394 and 395 are completely different, although the texts are relocated. The photo from A Nightmare on Elm Street is removed and replaced with a completely different one on page 399 of the new edition and erroneously said to be a 1985 release, and the photo from The Return of the Living Dead, previously the final entry in the book, on page 395 of the first edition is halved and shown on page 401. Even so, the second edition is 496 pages vs. 408 pages in the first. There is a minor correction on pages 48-49: Dracula and Frankenstein lead 1931. In the second edition, they are correctly alphabetized with no shifting of the photographs. A similar alphabetization error has Teenage Zombies moved from page 111 to page 110 in the second edition, and The Haunted Palace from 155 to 154.

=== Reviews ===
- Rue Morgue #132

== Volume Four ==
Volume IV: U.S. Edition

Published in 1998, The Aurum Film Encyclopedia: The Gangster Film follows the same basic format of the previous books, offering a chronological, decade-by-decade history of the genre. Hardy starts his history in 1928, noting in his introductory material that the genre did not exist prior to that. All films released through 1997 have capsule review entries. The contributors were Jeremy Clarke, Richard Coombs, David McGillivray, Tom Milne, Kim Newman, Tim Pulleine, and Paul Willemen. As with previous volumes, the film reviews are unsigned, and so details regarding what material each writer contributed to the book has not been made available to the reader. Two appendices are included, listings of the top grossing gangster films through 1998 and all Academy Award-winning and nominated films in the genre. Unlike the other three books in the series, this entry does not have a center color stills insert. The book has not been updated or reprinted.

== Future volumes ==
In his introduction to The Gangster Film, Hardy noted that work on a crime-themed “companion work” to that volume was in preparation. This book was to be devoted to private eyes, femmes fatales, murderers, and serial killers. To date, no such volume has been published.

The first book in the series, The Western, had laid out the complete plans for all future volumes. In addition to the published Western, Science Fiction, and Horror volumes, the remaining six “forthcoming” books were to be: Comedy, Romance, War, Epics, Musicals, and Thrillers.

Hardy died unexpectedly in Norfolk in 2014, aged 69.
