= The Aurum Film Encyclopedia, Volume 2: Science Fiction =

1984 book by Phil Hardy

- Author: Phil Hardy
- Publication date: 1984
- ISBN: 978-0688008420

The Aurum Film Encyclopedia, Volume 2: Science Fiction is a book by Phil Hardy published in 1984.

== Plot summary ==
The Aurum Film Encyclopedia, Volume 2: Science Fiction is a book that covers over 1200 science fiction films, going back from one-minute films of the 1890s up to the films released in 1983. Expanded editions were published on 1991 and 1995, and were published by The Overlook Press in the United States with the corresponding change in title.

== Reception ==
Dave Langford reviewed The Aurum Film Encyclopedia, Volume 2: Science Fiction for White Dwarf #60, and stated that "it's top class, for both browsing and reference."

Colin Greenland reviewed The Aurum Film Encyclopedia: Science Fiction for Imagine magazine, and stated that "Anyone who cares about SF films should badger librarians or gift-givers for a copy of The Aurum Film Encyclopedia: Science Fiction."

== Reviews ==
- Foundation, #55 Summer 1992
- The Zone, Summer 1996
