= Beyond Right and Wrong =

Beyond Right & Wrong: Stories of Justice and Forgiveness
- Directed by: Roger Spottiswoode; Lekha Singh
- Produced by: Lekha Singh; Rebecca Chaiklin
- Cinematography: Robert Adams, Robert Fitzgerald, Tony Hardmon
- Edited by: Paul Seydor, A.C.E.
- Music by: David Hirschfelder
- Production company: Article 19 Films
- Release date: October 5, 2012 (USA)
- Running time: 80 min.
- Country: USA
- Language: English

Beyond Right & Wrong: Stories of Justice and Forgiveness is a 2012 American documentary film about restorative justice and forgiveness. It is directed by Roger Spottiswoode and Lekha Singh and produced by Lekha Singh and Rebecca Chaiklin. The film depicts victims and perpetrators of the Rwandan genocide, the Israeli–Palestinian conflict, and The Troubles in Northern Ireland.

The film tells the stories of Bassam and Salwa Aramin, Emmanuel Bamporiki, Jo Berry, Robi Damelin, Rami Elhanan and Nurit Peled-Elhanan, Patrick Magee, Richard Moore, Beatrice (Beata) Mukangarambe, and Jean-Baptiste Ntakirutimana. Commentators include Lord John Alderdice, Denis Bradley, Marina Cantacuzino, Bishop John Rucyahana, and Dr. James Smith.

== Recognition ==
On 13 September 2012, United Nations Secretary-General Ban Ki-moon screened the film for the General Assembly in New York. The film was also part of the 'World Cinema Narrative' section at the 2012 Hamptons International Film Festival. In 2014, The Huffington Post ran a series of eight articles inspired by the film. Authors included Kweku Mandela Amuah, Judith Light, Jo Berry, and co-director and producer Lekha Singh.

=== Awards ===
Beyond Right & Wrong received the following awards:

2013:

- Best Avant Garde Film by the American Psychological Association
- Best Documentary Film by Fingal Film Festival
- Runner-up for Best Documentary by the LA Jewish Film Festival

2014:

- Social Impact Award at the Collective Conference in Park City, which bestowed a $50,000 matching grant from Pvblic.
- Co-director and producer Lekha Singh received the Snowball Influencer Award from Cause Brands.

=== Reviews ===
- John DeFore. "Beyond Right & Wrong: Stories of Justice and Forgiveness (Review)." The Hollywood Reporter. October 26, 2012. Retrieved July 24, 2014.
- Giles Fraser. "The key to forgiveness is the refusal to seek revenge." The Guardian. February 8, 2013. Retrieved July 24, 2014.
- Onslow. “Why Forgiveness is Imperative in the Modern World.” Corner Magazine. February 6, 2014. Retrieved July 23, 2014.
- Neil White. “Beyond Right & Wrong: Stories Of Justice And Forgiveness: Movie Review.” Every Film Blog. February 7, 2014. Retrieved July 23, 2014.
- Marina Cantacuzino. “Beyond Right and Wrong: How a Film Became a Peaceful Revolution.” Huff Post Impact. February 18, 2014. Updated April 20, 2014. Retrieved July 23, 2014.
- Frank Farley and Mona Sarshar. “From Giving to Forgiving—A Bridge Too Far?” PsycCRITIQUES, Vol. 59, No. 8, Article 9. February 24, 2014. Referenced by Ryan M. Niemiec. “The Imperative of Forgiveness and the Deployment of ‘Heroic’ Character Strengths.” PsycCRITIQUES Blog. March 27, 2014. Retrieved July 23, 2014.

=== Endorsements ===
Archbishop Desmond Tutu, Judith Light, Charlize Theron, Hugh Jackman, and Nelson Mandela’s grandson Kweku Mandela Amuah all tweeted about the film.

== Online Viewership ==
In February 2014, Beyond Right & Wrong collaborated with FilmRaise to promote the 52-minute version of the film while directing $500,000 to charity. A portion of the money donated by Operation Kids Foundation and Share the Mic is sent to a partnering charity when people watch the film online for free. Indiewire and Forbes also wrote about the campaign.

=== Partner Organizations ===
Beyond Right & Wrong and FilmRaise partnered with the following NGOs: Anasazi Foundation, Building Bridges for Peace, Cinema for Peace Foundation, ConnecTeach, Creative Visions Foundation, Empower Mali, The Forgiveness Project, Free the Children, Heshima Kenya, Inclusion Center for Community and Justice, The Institute for Justice and Reconciliation, Jeans 4 Justice, Kidnected World, The Malala Fund, Nelson Mandela Centre of Memory, PeacePlayers International, Search for Common Ground, Solar Electric Light Fund, Ubuntu Education Fund, Utah Refugee Center, Utah Rotary District 5420, WITNESS, and Women for Women International.

Promotional partners include The Arbinger Institute, BRITDOC, Pvblic Foundation, and the Tutu Global Forgiveness Challenge.

=== News Coverage ===
- Daniel Jenks. “Finding Forgiveness in the Darkest of Places.” MariaShriver.com. February 26, 2014. Retrieved July 23, 2014.
- “Madiba's grandson supports One Million Viewer campaign to drive justice and reconcilitation (sic).” Nelson Mandela.org. March 7, 2014. Retrieved July 23, 2014.
- Whitney Evans. “Local woman using inspiring films to incite charitable donations.” The Deseret News. March 22, 2014. Retrieved July 23, 2014.
- Candice Madsen. “Deseret News National Edition: Neon Trees, ways to end poverty and 'The Ten Today' series.” The Deseret News. April 13, 2014. Retrieved July 23, 2014.
- Philip Hellmich (interview host). “Beyond Right and Wrong with Lekha Singh, Mitch Warner, and John W. McDonald.” Shift Network. Recorded June 17, 2014. Retrieved July 23, 2014.
- Kweku Mandela. “New Film Offers Lesson in Forgiveness.” The African-American Observer. Retrieved July 23, 2014.
- Liz Smith. “Judith Light will Host a Screening.” JudithLight.com. Retrieved July 23, 2014.
