= Mary Cynthia Roche =

British aristocrat (1934–2023)

Mary Cynthia Burke Roche (19 August 1934 – 3 March 2023) was a British aristocrat, schoolteacher, and writer.

== Biography ==
Born at Peterculter, Aberdeenshire, on 19 August 1934, she was the eldest child of Maurice Roche, 4th Baron Fermoy, and Ruth Roche, Baroness Fermoy, a lady-in-waiting to Queen Elizabeth The Queen Mother. Roche was educated at Heathfield School, Ascot; St Paul's Girls' School, London; and in Florence, where she studied Italian and art history.

Roche briefly entered business with Mark Birley to secure the British franchise for Hermès luxury goods and later owned a short-lived Kenyan safari airline. In mid-life, she earned a classics degree from University College London and taught at secondary schools in London. She also published Call Me Maurice: The Life and Times of Lord Fermoy, 1885–1955 (2007) and remained active in the King's Lynn Festival founded by her mother.

Roche married three times. Her first husband, Anthony Berry (m. 25 Nov 1954, div. 1966), later a Conservative MP, was killed in the Brighton hotel bombing; they had four children. She married Denis Geoghegan, a UCL tutor, in 1973 (div. 1980), and classics master Michael Gunningham in 1981 (div. 1989).
