= Anthony Berry =

British Conservative politician (1925–1984)

The Honourable Sir Anthony Berry
- 1978 portrait

Deputy Chief Whip Treasurer of the Household
- In office 17 February 1983 – 11 June 1983
- Prime Minister: Margaret Thatcher
- Preceded by: John Stradling Thomas
- Succeeded by: John Cope

Comptroller of the Household
- In office 30 September 1981 – 17 February 1983
- Prime Minister: Margaret Thatcher
- Preceded by: Spencer Le Marchant
- Succeeded by: Carol Mather

Vice-Chamberlain of the Household
- In office 5 May 1979 – 30 September 1981
- Prime Minister: Margaret Thatcher
- Preceded by: Donald Coleman
- Succeeded by: Carol Mather

Member of Parliament for Enfield Southgate Southgate (1964–1983)
- In office 15 October 1964 – 12 October 1984
- Preceded by: Sir Beverley Baxter
- Succeeded by: Michael Portillo

Personal details
- Born: Anthony George Berry; 12 February 1925 Eton, Buckinghamshire
- Died: 12 October 1984 (aged 59) Brighton, East Sussex, UK
- Cause of death: Assassinated by bombing
- Party: Conservative
- Spouses: Mary Burke Roche (m. 1954; div. 1966) Sarah Clifford-Turner (m. 1966)
- Children: 6, including Jo (by Roche)
- Parent: Gomer Berry (father)
- Education: Christ Church, Oxford

Sir Anthony George Berry (12 February 1925 – 12 October 1984) was a British Conservative politician. He served as Member of Parliament (MP) for Enfield Southgate and a Whip in Margaret Thatcher's government.

Berry sat in the House of Commons for twenty years until being killed in the Brighton hotel bombing of 1984 by the Provisional Irish Republican Army.

== Early life ==
Born in Eton, Buckinghamshire, Berry was the sixth and youngest son of the newspaper magnate Gomer Berry, 1st Viscount Kemsley, and his wife Mary née Holmes.

Educated at Eton College, he went up to Christ Church, Oxford (graduating MA), before serving as a Lieutenant in the Welsh Guards from 1943 to 1947.

== Career ==
After resigning his commission in the Guards, Berry went into journalism. He was an Assistant Editor of The Sunday Times from 1952 to 1954, when he was appointed as Editor of the Sunday Chronicle.

Berry served as High Sheriff of Glamorgan for 1962/63.

Standing as a Conservative, he was elected as Member of Parliament for Southgate (later Enfield Southgate) at the 1964 general election, and served in Margaret Thatcher's government after the Conservatives won the 1979 general election as Vice-Chamberlain of the Household between 1979 and 1981, then as Comptroller of the Household from 1981 to 1983, and was appointed Treasurer of the Household in 1983. Berry was knighted in December 1983.

== Death ==
On 12 October 1984, Berry was murdered in the Brighton hotel bombing, when a bomb was planted at the Grand Brighton Hotel during the Conservative Party Conference. He was 59. Sir Anthony was survived by his wife, Lady Berry, who was injured in the blast. His death occurred three days before the 20th anniversary of his first election to Parliament in 1964.

Berry dying in office triggered a by-election in Enfield Southgate, which was won by future Cabinet minister Michael Portillo.

In September 1986, Patrick Magee, who carried out the bombing, received eight life sentences, but was released from prison in 1999 under the terms of the Good Friday Agreement.

Since Magee's release, Berry's daughter Jo, has been appointed CBE after receiving attention for her series of controversial meetings with the Brighton bomber, as part of her quest to come to terms with the bombing and, in her own words, "to bring something positive out of it". Some of their discussions were filmed for an Everyman programme, shown on BBC Two in December 2001. She has received criticism from other families of IRA victims for her liaisons.

A ceremony was held in Berry's Enfield Southgate constituency on 12 October 2009, the 25th anniversary of the bombing, at which his widow (wife of Lord Donoughue) and her daughter Sasha unveiled a plaque in his honour at the newly-renamed Sir Anthony Berry House in Chaseville Parade, Winchmore Hill.

== Personal life ==
In 1954, at Westminster, Berry married firstly the Hon. Mary Cynthia Roche (1934–2023), a daughter of Maurice Roche, 4th Baron Fermoy. Mary's sister, Frances Shand Kydd, married John Spencer, 8th Earl Spencer, and so Berry was an uncle of Diana, Princess of Wales.

Berry and his wife Mary had four children: Alexandra Mary Bartz (born 1955), Antonia Ruth Butterworth and Joanna Cynthia Tufnell (twins, born 1957), and Edward Anthony Morys Berry (born 1960), whose son William Berry married Alicia Rose Meynell in 2024.

He married secondly Sarah Clifford-Turner at Chelsea in 1966, having two more children: George (born 1967), and Sasha Jane (born 1969).

Shortly before his death, Sir Anthony was being prosecuted for drink-driving and reckless driving after allegedly driving at two police officers who were attempting to stop his vehicle, injuring one of them; allegedly he also narrowly missed hitting two pedestrians.

== Honours and appointments ==
- 1983: Knight Bachelor
- 1962: Commander of the Most Venerable Order of St John (CStJ)
  - 1962/63: High Sheriff of Glamorgan
  - 1960: Justice of the Peace (JP)

Coat of arms of the Hon. Sir Anthony Berry
Crest A Griffin sejant Sable collared and chained the Chain reflexed over the back and resting the dexter claw on a Catherine Wheel Or Helm That of a Knight Escutcheon Gules three Bars Or on a Pile Ermine as many Martlets Sable Motto Persevera et Vince (Latin for Persevere and conquer) Orders Surrounding the Shield, the Circlet of the Order of St John and suspended below, by its Ribbon, the Badge of a Knight Bachelor

== See also ==
- List of British MPs killed in office
- Viscount Kemsley

Parliament of the United Kingdom
Preceded by Sir Beverley Baxter	Member of Parliament for Southgate; 1964–1983	Constituency renamed
New constituency	Member of Parliament for Enfield Southgate; 1983–1984	Succeeded by Michael Portillo
Political offices
Preceded by Donald Coleman	Vice-Chamberlain of the Household; 1979–1981	Succeeded by Carol Mather
Preceded by Spencer Le Marchant	Comptroller of the Household; 1981–1983	Succeeded by Carol Mather
Preceded by John Stradling Thomas	Treasurer of the Household; 1983	Succeeded by John Cope
Party political offices
Preceded by John Stradling Thomas	Conservative Deputy Chief Whip in the House of Commons; 1983	Succeeded by John Cope
