= Jo Berry =

British activist

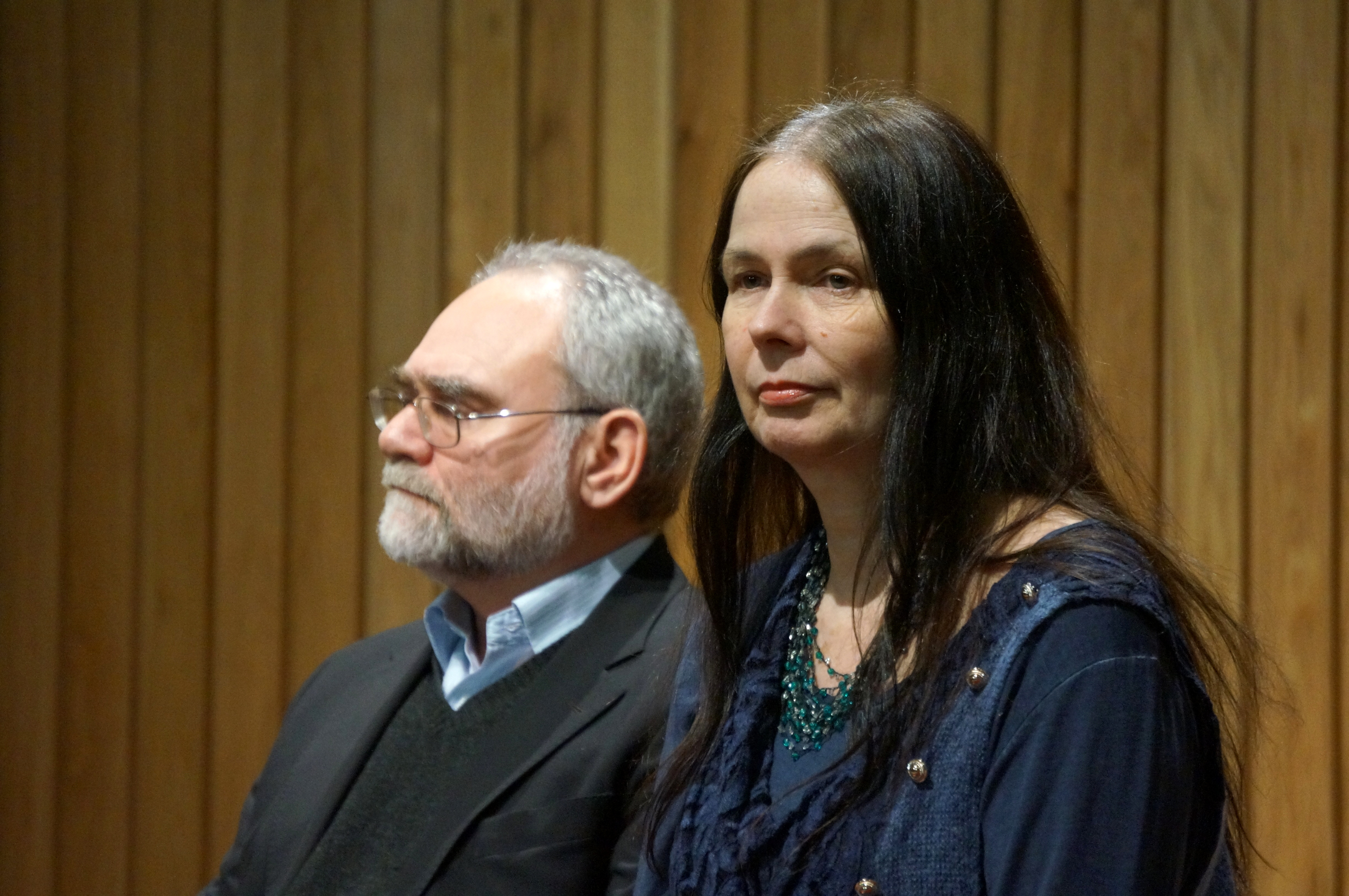
Jo Berry (right) and Patrick Magee (left) peace building in Belfast

Joanna Cynthia Berry CBE (born 1957) is a British peace builder and public speaker. She is a twin daughter of Sir Anthony Berry MP, who was killed in the IRA Brighton hotel bombing on 12 October 1984.

The IRA bomb was planted by Patrick Magee, whom Jo Berry publicly met in November 2000 in an effort to achieving reconciliation as envisioned in the wake of the Good Friday Agreement.

Berry through her mother is a first cousin of Diana, Princess of Wales, and lives in Somerset.

== Reconciliation ==
Arms of the Hon. Sir Anthony Berry

Following her father's assassination, Berry committed her life to conflict resolution. After Patrick Magee's release from prison in 1999 she went on to meet him several times. These meetings over ten months formed the basis of a BBC documentary first broadcast on 13 December 2001.

In July 2003 Berry spoke at St Ethelburga's Centre for Reconciliation and Peace, itself rebuilt after being destroyed by the IRA in the 1993 Bishopsgate bombing. Her reconciliation work was featured in the film Beyond Right and Wrong.

== Charitable work ==
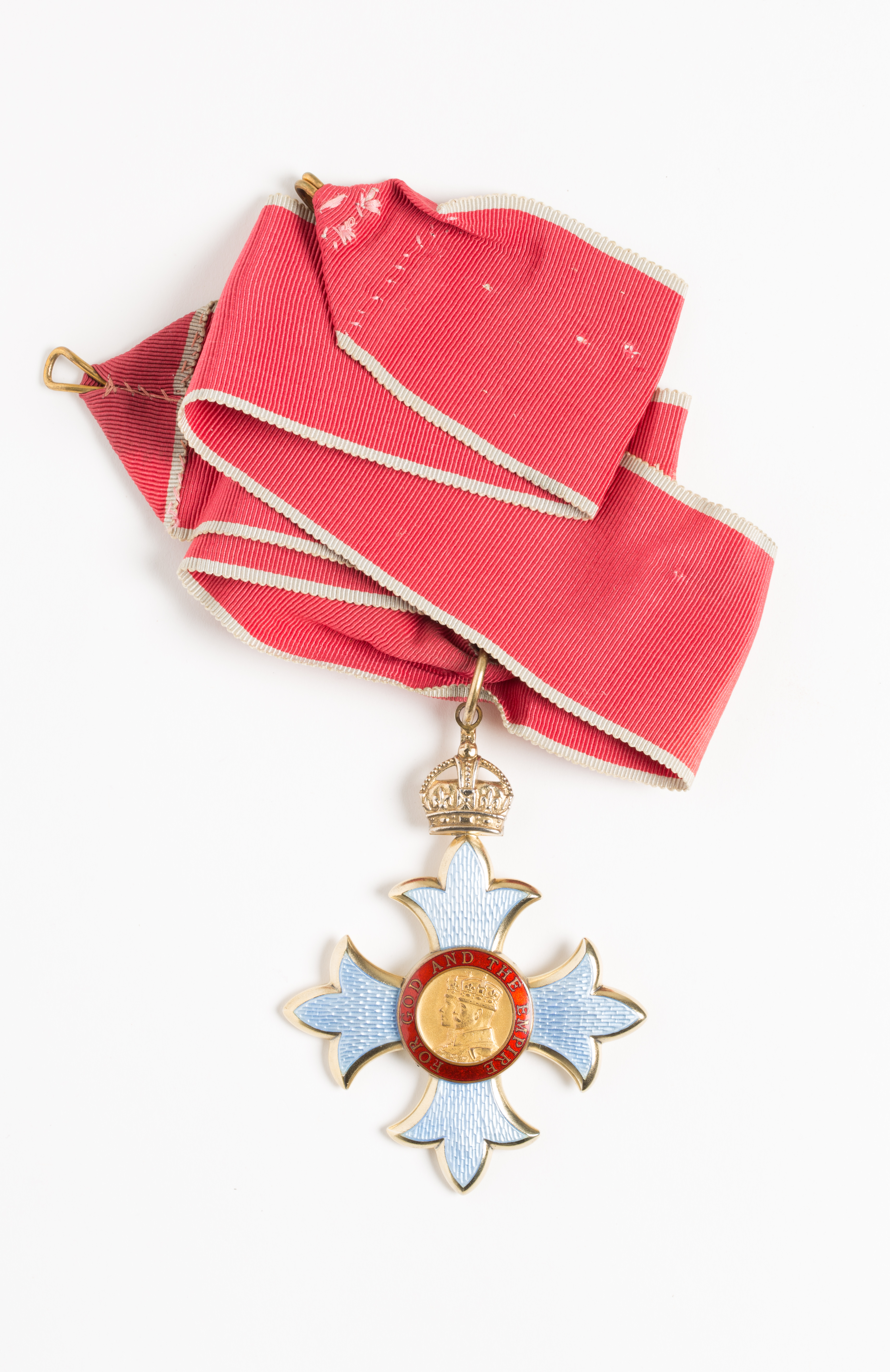
CBE insignia

Berry founded the charity Building Bridges for Peace on the 18 October 2009.

On Monday 21 March 2011, Berry spoke at London's Peace One Day Conference and on Wednesday 12 May 2011, she spoke on a panel with Magee, Archbishop Desmond Tutu and Mary Kayitesi Blewitt, who lost over 50 members of her family in the Rwandan genocide.

Established speakers, Berry and Magee have appeared together on over 300 occasions, most recently in Rwanda, Lebanon and Israel as well as locally at Belfast in Northern Ireland.

Berry was appointed CBE for "services to peace and reconciliation" in the 2025 King's Birthday honours list.

== See also ==
- Viscount Kemsley
