= Máire Nic an Bhaird =

Irish activist

Máire Nic an Bhaird (Irish pronunciation: [ˈmˠaːɾʲə n̠ʲəc ə ˈwaːɾˠdʲ]; English: Moira Ward; born 1982) is a secondary school teacher and Irish language activist from Dunmurry, County Antrim in Northern Ireland.

On 26 February 2007 she was found guilty of disorderly conduct and fined £100, arising from an incident in May 2006 in south Belfast. She maintained she was arrested for speaking in Irish to an officer of the Police Service of Northern Ireland (PSNI), and was acquitted on appeal in September 2007.

== Court case ==
Nic an Bhaird was arrested after leaving a public house on the Malone Road in south Belfast with friends after a night out. She became involved in an altercation with police officers, who alleged that she said Tiocfaidh ár lá, Irish for "our day will come", a phrase associated with republican support for the Provisional Irish Republican Army. Nic an Bhaird maintains she said Tiocfaidh bhur lá, "your day will come", meaning "you'll have your chance".

The court case was adjourned several times between June 2006 and January 2007. At her first court appearance her lawyer made it clear he would be talking to his client in Irish and made a submission that she should have the right to defend her case wholly in Irish. Her counsel was considering on 30 October 2006 whether to apply for a judicial review of the case. In February 2007, the presiding magistrate ruled that Nic an Bhaird had consumed a "substantial amount" of alcohol, and "continued to address police officers in a loud and aggressive manner", and was guilty of disorderly behaviour. She was acquitted on appeal in September 2007.

== Irish language dimension ==
Nic an Bhaird is a native speaker of Irish and attended Belfast's Irish-language secondary school, Coláiste Feirste, where she was taught by Sinn Féin MEP Bairbre de Brún. Irish-language organisations, including Na Gaeil Óga ("the Young Gaels") of which Nic an Bhaird is a member, have condemned her case as victimisation based on language, and have charged that she was assaulted by the arresting PSNI officer.

She claimed police demanded she speak English before releasing her from custody after her arrest. The Good Friday Agreement does provide for some official accommodation for the Irish language in Northern Ireland, but the required level of support is not precisely specified.

== See also ==
- Language politics
- The Celtic League
