= Julian Petley =

British media scholar

- Born: January 1949 (age 77)
- Occupations: Professor; journalist; writer

Academic work
- Discipline: Politics and History; Social and Political Sciences
- Institutions: Brunel University of London

Julian Petley (born 1949) is a British media scholar and Honorary Professor of Social and Political Sciences at Brunel University of London. He is also a freelance journliast, publishing articles mainly online.

Petley has authored, co-authored, and co-edited a number of books including Ill Effects (1997), British Horror Cinema (2001), Culture Wars (2005), Film and Video Censorship in Modern Britain (2011), Moral Panics in the Contemporary World (2013), and Shocking Cinema of the 70s (2023).

Petley is a professor of journalism at Brunel University and his teaching areas are in media policy and regulation and the history of British cinema and television. He is a member of the editorial board of the British Journalism Review and he is a member of the National Council of the Campaign for Press and Broadcasting Freedom. He has also contributed to sites like Open Democracy and The Guardian.

== Books published ==
- Petley, Julian (1979). Capital and Cultures: German Cinema, 1933–45. London: British Film Institute. ISBN 978-0-8517-0088-5.
- Petley, Julian (1987). Dudley Moore. London: W.H. Allen. ISBN 978-0-4910-3137-0.
- Barker, Martin; Petley, Julian, eds. (1997). Ill Effects: The Media-Violence Debate. London: Routledge. ISBN 978-0-415-14672-2.
- Chibnall, Steve; Petley, Julian, eds. (2001). British Horror Cinema. London: Routledge. doi:10.4324/9780203996768. ISBN 978-0-203-99676-8.
- Petley, Julian (2001). The Media: The Impact on Our Lives. Oxford: Heinemann/Raintree. ISBN 978-0-7398-3175-5.
- Petley, Julian (2002). Advertising: Technology, People, Process. London: Smart Apple Media. ISBN 978-1-5834-0255-9.
- Curran, James; Gaber, Ivor; Petley, Julian (2005). Culture Wars: The Media and the British Left. Edinburgh: Edinburgh University Press. ISBN 978-0-7486-1917-7.
- Petley, Julian (2007). Censoring the Word. London: Seagull Books. ISBN 978-1-9054-2254-8.
- French, Philip; Petley, Julian (2008). Censoring the Moving Image. London: Seagull Books. ISBN 978-1-9054-2255-5.
- Petley, Julian (2009). Censorship: A Beginner's Guide. Oxford: Oneworld Publications. ISBN 978-1-8516-8674-2.
- Wayne, Mike; Petley, Julian; Murray, Craig; Henderson, Lesley (2010). Television News, Politics and Young People: Generation Disconnected?. Basingstoke: Palgrave Macmillan. ISBN 978-0-2302-1935-9.
- Petley, Julian (2011). Film and Video Censorship in Modern Britain. Edinburgh: Edinburgh University Press. ISBN 978-0-7486-2539-0.
- Petley, Julian; Richardson, Robin, eds. (2011). Pointing the Finger: Islam and Muslims in the British Media. Oxford: Oneworld Publications. ISBN 978-1-8516-8812-8.
- Abraham-Hamanoiel, Alejandro; Freedman, Des; Khiabany, Gholam; Nash, Kate; Petley, Julian, eds. (2017). Liberalism in Neoliberal Times: Dimensions, Contradictions, Limits. London: Goldsmith's Press. ISBN 978-1-906-89745-1.
- Petley, Julian; Mendik, Xavier, eds. (2021). Shocking Cinema of the 70s. London. ISBN 978-1-350-13632-8.
