= Phil Hardy (journalist) =

British journalist (1945–2014)

- Born: Philippe George Hardy; 7 April 1945; Scarborough, Yorkshire, England
- Died: 8 April 2014 (aged 69); Norfolk, England

Philippe George "Phil" 'Hardy (7 April 1945 – 8 April 2014) was an English film and music industry journalist.

== Life and career ==
Hardy was born in Scarborough, Yorkshire in 1945 and studied at the University of Sussex, 1964–1969. He was a visiting student at the University of California, Berkeley (1966–1967). At Sussex he was a member of the committee of students, including Mike Robinson and Gary Herman, who ran the University of Sussex Film Society in 1968–1969, during which time the Society launched The Brighton Film Review.

He worked as a freelance music and screenwriter, writing for Time Out, Variety and other publications while at the same time acting as a consultant on music business issues for bodies such as the Greater London Enterprise Board and the World Bank. In 1986 he travelled to Eritrea, Ethiopia and Sudan to research and write the documentary film, Food Trucks & Rock 'n' Roll about how the money raised by Band Aid was spent in Africa. He was the founding editor of Music and Copyright, a biweekly newsletter offering news and analysis on the international music industry. The newsletter was bought by the Informa Media Group and in 2008 Hardy left to publish and edit the online newsletter www.theviewfromtheboundary.com. Hardy spoke and contributed on copyright issues at many music business conferences.

He wrote or edited several books on music and film, including Samuel Fuller (1970), and The British Film Institute Companion to Crime (1997). He was the chief editor and contributing writer of The Aurum Film Encyclopedia series that included The Western (vol. 1, 1983) which won the BFI Book Award in 1984, Science Fiction (vol. 2, 1984), Horror (vol. 3, 1984), and The Gangster Film (vol. 4, 1998). With Dave Laing, he edited The Encyclopedia of Rock (1975), and The Faber Companion to 20th Century Popular Music (1990). In 2012 he self-published Dire Straits, an account of the 12 major music markets in 2010-2011, as a Kindle book. His account of the last 20 or so years of the record industry, Download!: How Digital Destroyed the Record Industry, was published in early 2013 by Omnibus Press. A book about music publishing and copyright administration since 2000, Nickels & Dimes, was scheduled to be published in May 2014. At the time of his death he was working on a history of the Universal Music Group, Building the World’s Largest Record Company. With Dave Laing, he co-owned a major photo library of promotional photos of pop and rock stars.

Hardy died unexpectedly in Norfolk in 2014, aged 69.
