= Slán abhaile =

Irish expression, bidding someone farewell

Slán abhaile (Irish: [ˌsˠl̪ˠaːnˠ əˈwalʲə]) is an Irish language phrase used to bid goodbye to someone who is travelling home. A literal translation of the phrase is "safe home", which is used in the same way in Hiberno-English. Slán ('safe') is used in many Irish-language farewell formulas; abhaile means 'homeward'.

In the Republic of Ireland, "slán abhaile" frequently appears on road signs placed alongside roads which are leaving a town or village.

In Northern Ireland, the phrase was also used on murals drawn by Irish republicans which celebrated the end of Operation Banner, the deployment of the British Armed Forces to the region during the Troubles, as a result of the Northern Ireland peace process that culminated in the 1998 Good Friday Agreement.

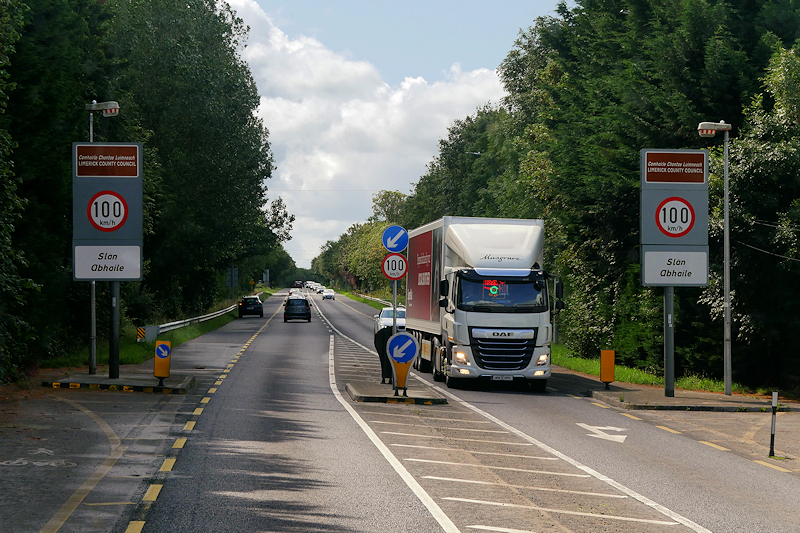
The phrase is commonly seen on road signs in the Republic
