= Ivor Gaber =

British journalist

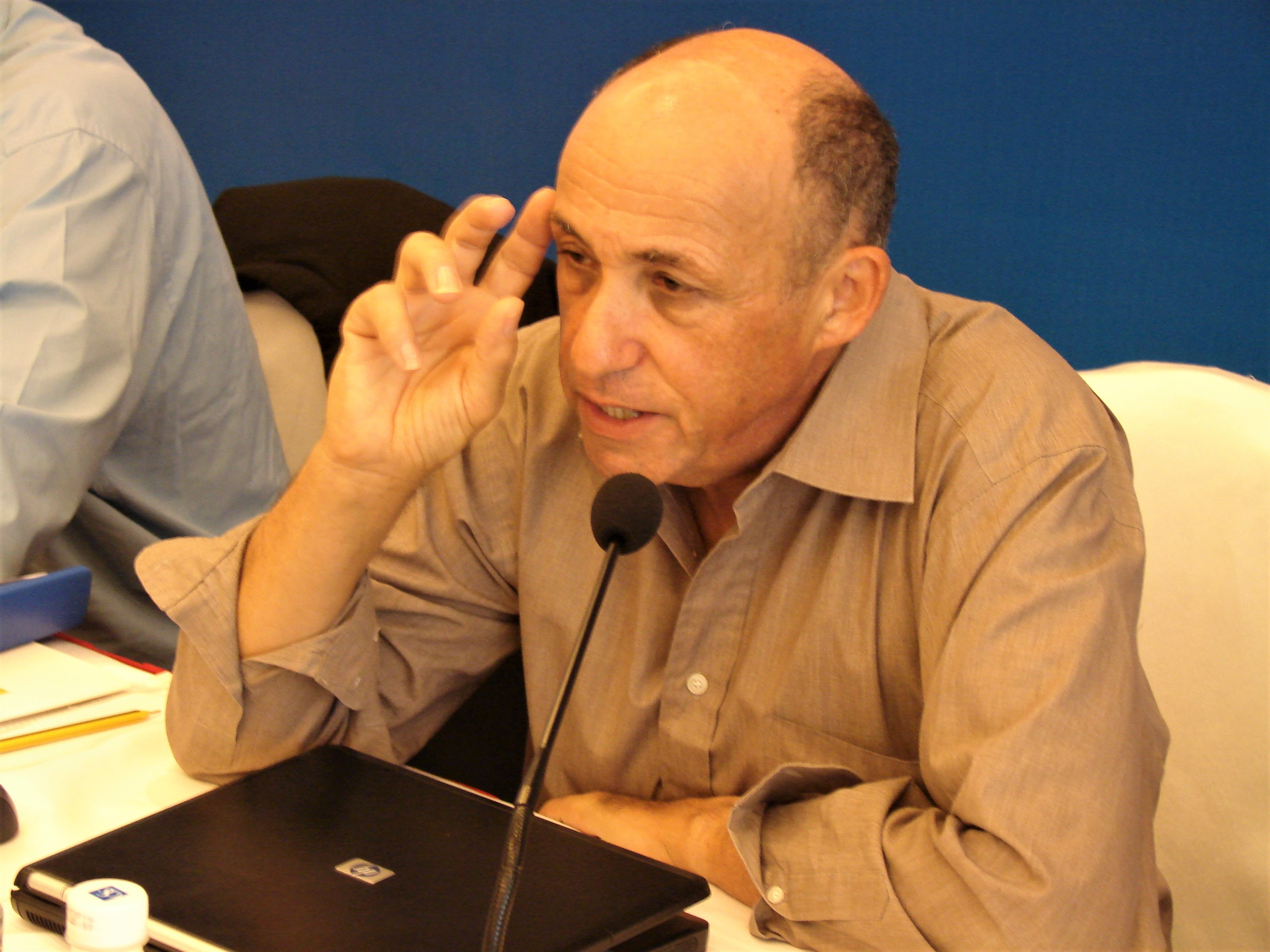

Ivor Harold Gaber OBE is a British academic and journalist, a former professor of political journalism at University of Sussex, and emeritus professor of broadcast journalism at Goldsmiths, University of London. He serves as the UK representative on UNESCO’s International Programme for the Development of Communication.

== Early life ==
Born in High Wycombe, Buckinghamshire, he grew up in London and read for a BA in history and politics at the University of Warwick before completing an MA in labour studies at the University of Sussex. He was awarded a PhD by City, University of London, in 2013 for his thesis Crisis in Political Communications? Reflections of a Critical Practitioner.

== Career ==
=== Journalism ===
Gaber began his broadcasting career in 1978 at Independent Television News (ITN) as a scriptwriter and item producer. He was a member of the ITN planning team that devised and launched Channel 4 News In 1982 he joined the Watchdog team at BBC TV as an investigate reporter and subsequently left to form Sevenday Productions and then Commons Committee Television where he led the successful bid to televise the committees of the Lords and Commons and then the contract to televise both the main chambers. Subsequently he returned to the BBC where he planned and oversaw how the then new radio station, BBC Radio 5 Live, would cover politics on a 24/7 basis. Between 1997 and 2019 he was the results editor for ITV News’s live general election results programme. As an independent radio producer he devised and produced a weekly person-in-the-news programme for BBC Radio 5 Live and a weekly programme about life in the UK for BBC World Service.

=== Academic career ===
In 2015, Gaber became the University of Sussex's first professor of journalism. He is also emeritus professor of broadcast journalism at Goldsmiths, University of London, visiting professor of media and politics at the University of Bedfordshire and senior research fellow at City, University of London. He has published over 70 articles and chapters in the field of political communications and has authored or co-authored five books, with the most recent being: Culture Wars:The Media And The British Left (with J. Curran and J. Petley) London, Routledge 2019.

=== International experience ===
At UNESCO, representing the UK, Gaber initiated the UN Plan of Action on the Safety of Journalists and the Issue of Impunity. He has worked with political journalists in countries transitioning to democracy beginning in the former communist countries of eastern Europe and the Soviet Union. Recently he has focused mainly on sub-Saharan Africa including devising and running election reporting projects in Nigeria, Malawi and Uganda.

Gaber was appointed Officer of the Order of the British Empire (OBE) in the 2023 Birthday Honours for services to media freedom internationally.

== Books ==
- In The Best Interests Of The Child : Culture, Identity, and Transracial Adoption. London: Free Association Books. 1994. ISBN 978-1853431524.
- Culture Wars : The Media And The British Left (2nd ed.). Milton: Routledge. (2018). ISBN 1138223034.
- Environmentalism And The Mass Media: The North-South Divide. Routledge. (1997). ISBN 978-0-415-15504-5.
