= Diarmait Mac Giolla Chríost =

Irish academic

Diarmait Mac Giolla Chriost is an Irish academic in the area of linguistics.

== Life ==
Born and raised in Ireland, Mac Giolla Chríost became a lecturer in the School of Welsh at Cardiff University in 2004. As of 2016 he was a Reader there and a member of the school's research unit on language, policy and planning. He is a native of Ireland and an authority on linguistic minorities and language planning, and, in particular, the situation of the Irish language. He is now a professor at the university.

== Selected bibliography ==
=== Articles ===
- "Implementing political agreement in Northern Ireland: Planning issues for Irish language policy" (2001).
- "The Language Question" (2009).
- "Linguistic Diversity and the City: Some Reflections, and a Research Agenda" (2008).
- "Irish gets out of jail" (2008).
- "A language of our own" (2008).
- "The origins of "the Jailtacht" (2010).

== Books ==
- Language, identity and conflict: a comparative study of language in ethnic conflict in Europe and Eurasia, Routledge, London, 2003.
- The Irish language in Ireland: from Goídel to globalisation, Routledge, London, 2005.
- Language and the city. Language and Globalization Palgrave Macmillan, Basingstoke, 2007.
- Jailtacht: the Irish language, symbolic power and political violence in Northern Ireland, 1972-2008, Cardiff, 2012.
- The Welsh Language Commissioner in context: roles, methods and relationships, Cardiff, 2012
