= Patrick Magee (Irish republican) =

Provisional Irish Republican Army member (born 1951)

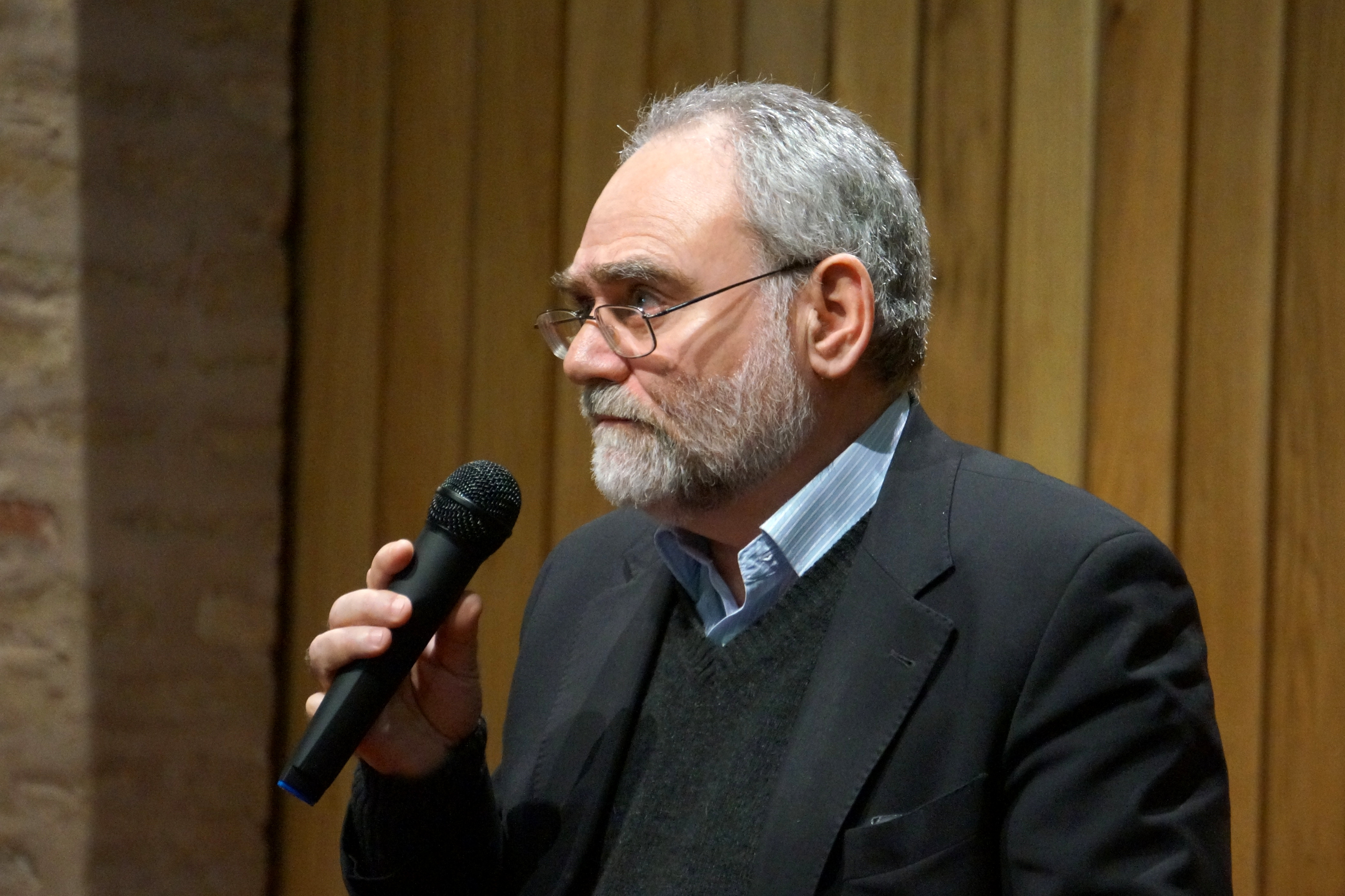
- Dr Patrick Magee in 2014
- Born: Patrick Joseph Magee; 1951 (age 74–75); Belfast, Northern Ireland
- Known for: Brighton hotel bombing
- Spouse(s): Eileen McGreevy (m. 1977, divorced) Barbara Byer (m. 1997)

Patrick Joseph Magee (born 1951), often referred to as the Brighton bomber, is a former Provisional Irish Republican Army (IRA) volunteer. In 1984 he planted a bomb in the Grand Hotel, Brighton, targeting Margaret Thatcher, the Prime Minister, and her Cabinet; the bomb killed five people.

== Early life and IRA career ==
Patrick Magee was born at Belfast and moved with his family to Norwich aged two. Returning to Belfast in 1969 aged 18, in 1972 Magee joined the Provisional IRA; a suspected terrorist, he was interned without trial at Long Kesh between June 1973 and November 1975.

Magee married fellow Republican activist Eileen McGreevy in 1977. The couple eventually divorced. In August 1997, he married an American, Barbara Byer.

== Brighton hotel bombing ==
The plot to bomb the Grand Hotel started as an act of revenge for the stance the British Government had taken over the 1981 Irish hunger strike.

Magee had stayed in the Grand Hotel Brighton under the false name of Roy Walsh four weeks previously, during the weekend of 14–17 September 1984. He planted the bomb, with a long-delay timer, in the bathroom wall of his room, number 629. The bomb exploded at 2:54 a.m. on 12 October 1984, killing five people and injuring 34. Magee was arrested in the Queen's Park area of Glasgow on 22 June 1985 with four other IRA members, including Martina Anderson, while planning other bombings in England. In April 2023 the Scottish Special Branch officer in charge was interviewed and gave an account of the operation and arrests: "I've seen Magee on television a couple times since then and he still thinks he did the right thing, but I've always thought I'd like to meet him again and see what he has to say."

At his trial in September 1986, Magee received eight life sentences, with the judge branding him "a man of exceptional cruelty and inhumanity".

In August 2000, Magee admitted to The Guardian that he carried out the bombing, but did not accept he left a fingerprint on the registration card, claiming "If that was my fingerprint I did not put it there". While in prison, Magee read Politics and Modern Art, graduating BA with first-class honours (The Open University) and received a PhD degree (Ulster University), examining the representation of Irish republicans in Troubles fiction.

== After prison ==
Magee was released from prison in 1999 under the terms of the Good Friday Agreement, having served 14 years. Originally he was sentenced to eight life sentences and a minimum tariff of 35 years. Jack Straw, then Home Secretary, attempted to block Magee's release by judicial review of the High Court of Justice in Northern Ireland, which decreed that the Northern Ireland Sentence Review Commission had "[not] acted in bad faith" and whose decision was "totally reasoned and carefully formulated". Mr Justice (later Lord Justice) Girvan added: "Whether one agrees with the final decision or not is irrelevant in this case ... History will be the ultimate judge."

Magee continues to defend his role in the blast, but he has expressed remorse for the loss of innocent lives. One of the victims of the bombing was Sir Anthony Berry, whose daughter Jo publicly met Magee in November 2000 aiming to achieve reconciliation. They have met several dozen times since that date, giving rise to (false) rumours of romantic involvement.

Harvey Thomas, a senior adviser to Thatcher who survived the bombing, saw fit to forgive Magee in 1998. Thomas since developed a friendship with Magee, including hosting him in his London home. Thomas cited his Christian faith for enabling to offer forgiveness. Norman Tebbit, whose wife was paralysed in the Brighton bombing, said in 2009 that he could forgive Magee only if he went to the police and provided them with the names of anyone else who was responsible for the bombing. Tebbit argued that Magee giving up violence was insufficient, stating: "If Dr Shipman had announced he was not going to murder any more of his patients, I don't think we would have felt that was a case for going 'good old Shipman' and giving him a slap on the back and a special award from the BMA."

== Books ==
- Dr Patrick Magee, Gangsters or Guerrillas? Representations of Irish Republicans in 'Troubles Fiction' (2001) ISBN 1-900960-14-1
- Dr Patrick Magee, Where Grieving Begins: Building Bridges after the Brighton Bomb – a Memoir (2021) ISBN 978-0-7453-4177-4

== See also ==
- The Troubles
