= 1981 Irish hunger strike =

Protest by Irish republican prisoners in Northern Ireland

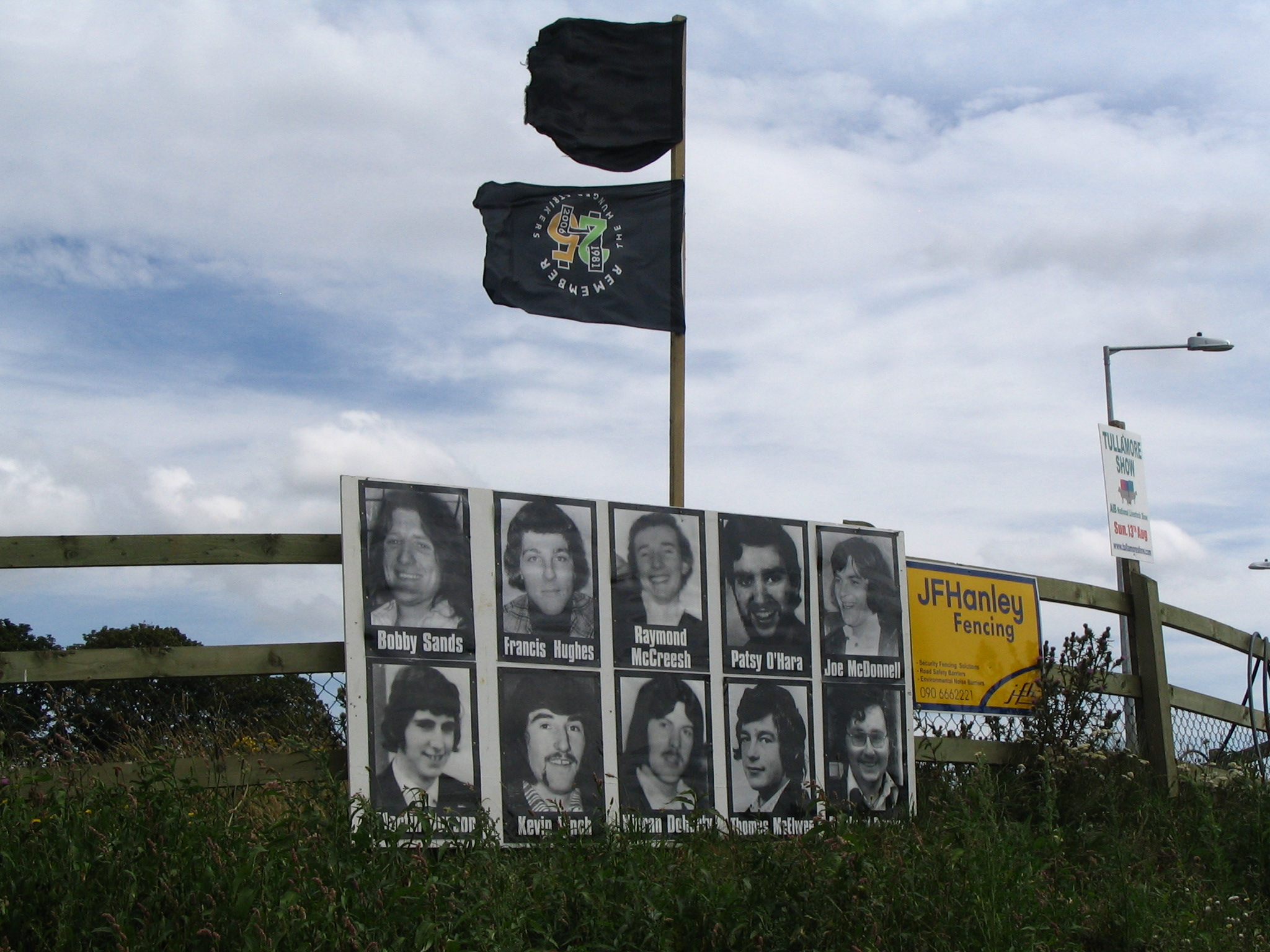
A commemoration on the 2006 25th anniversary of the hunger strike

A five-year protest during the Troubles by Irish republican prisoners in Northern Ireland culminated in a hunger strike in 1981. The protest began as the blanket protest in 1976 when the British government withdrew Special Category Status (prisoner of war rather than criminal status) for convicted paramilitary prisoners.

In 1978, the dispute escalated into the dirty protest, where prisoners refused to leave their cells to wash and covered the walls of their cells with excrement. In 1980, seven prisoners participated in the first hunger strike, which ended after 53 days.

The second hunger strike took place in 1981 and was a showdown between the prisoners and the prime minister, Margaret Thatcher. One of the hunger strikers, Bobby Sands, was elected as a member of the British parliament; Kieran Doherty and Paddy Agnew were elected in the 1981 Irish general election to Dáil Éireann during the strike, prompting media interest from around the world. The strike was called off after ten prisoners had starved themselves to death, including Sands, whose funeral was attended by 100,000 people. The strike was the driving force that enabled Sinn Féin to become a mainstream political party.

== Background ==
=== Tradition of hunger striking ===
He has chosen death:
Refusing to eat or drink, that he may bring
Disgrace upon me; for there is a custom,
An old and foolish custom, that if a man
Be wronged, or think that he is wronged, and starve
Upon another’s threshold till he die,
The common people, for all time to come,
Will raise a heavy cry against that threshold,
Even though it be the King’s. (Note: Professor Anthony Bradley has summed up the crux of the play as that "the King is shown to reluctantly register the moral force and political efficacy of Seanchan’s hunger strike, precisely because he is willing to die for his beliefs". Yeats's play was probably originally inspired by the English suffragette movement, but following the death on hunger strike of Terence MacSwiney in 1920, Yeats rewrote the play's "new 'tragic ending' ...as it suggests the Lord Mayor of Cork". Yeats's poem has become, says critic Niall Ó Dochartaigh, "the literary reference of choice for the Irish hunger strikes".)

— W. B. Yeats, The King's Threshold

The use of a hunger strike as a means of protest in Ireland is a tradition dating to pre-Christian times. This was not ascetic, but rather a way of publicly reprimanding those who deserved it. By fasting—possibly to death—on the doorstep of his master, the hunger striker enforced a claim against the other until either the latter gave in or the faster died. This tradition carried on even into the Christian era, and there are documented cases of early Irish saints fasting against God. The tradition of Troscad—fasting against an opponent—and Cealachan—gaining justice through fasting—became codified in the 8th century Senchas Már.

In the 20th century, there had been hunger strikes by Irish republican prisoners since 1917. Twelve men died on hunger strike prior to the 1981 strikes: Thomas Ashe (1917), Terence MacSwiney (1920), Michael Fitzgerald (1920), Joe Murphy (1920), Joseph Whitty (1923), Andy O'Sullivan (1923), Denny Barry (1923) (see 1923 Irish hunger strikes), Tony D'Arcy (1940), Jack McNeela (1940), Seán McCaughey (1946), Michael Gaughan (1974), and Frank Stagg (1976).

=== Internment ===
Terence MacSwiney, an Irish republican who died on hunger strike in Brixton Prison in 1920

Although The Troubles had been ongoing since 1969, internment—which had been used several times in Ireland during the 20th century by both the British and Irish Free State—was not introduced until 1971. Internees were originally held in a disused RAF base in County Down, called Long Kesh. Later renamed HM Prison Maze, it was run along the lines of a prisoner of war camp, complete, says the author Thomas Hennessey, "with imagery reminiscent of Second World War POW camps surrounded by barbed wire, watchtowers and Nissen huts". Internees lived in dormitories and disciplined themselves with military-style command structures, drilled with dummy guns made from wood, and held lectures on guerrilla warfare and politics. (Note: Although conditions in the huts were poor, this was not the government's main concern, but the overall loss of control by the authorities. The civil servant John Gardiner, reported that prisons of the compound type, each compound holding up to ninety prisoners, are thoroughly unsatisfactory from every point of view; their major disadvantage is that there is virtually a total loss of disciplinary control by the prison authorities inside the compounds ... The layout and construction of the compounds make close and continued supervision impossible".)

Convicted prisoners were refused the same rights as internees until July 1972, when Special Category Status was introduced following a hunger strike by 40 Provisional Irish Republican Army (IRA) prisoners led by the veteran republican Billy McKee. Special Category, or political status, meant prisoners were treated similarly to prisoners of war; for example, not having to wear prison uniforms or do prison work.

On 1 March 1976, Merlyn Rees, the Secretary of State for Northern Ireland in the Wilson ministry, announced that paramilitary prisoners would no longer be entitled to Special Category Status. This was part of Britain's long-term strategy of criminalisation in the north, the intention being to alter perceptions of the conflict from a colonial war to that of a campaign against, effectively, criminal gangs. The policy was not imposed retroactively and only affected those convicted of offences after 1 March 1976. Long Kesh prisoners remained in the huts, but new intakes arrived at eight newly built cellular "H-Blocks", so called due to their layout.

After the introduction of the strategy of internment in 1971, both IRA violence and recruitment escalated. (Note: In the event, this was the most intense period of their campaign, with approximately half the total of 650 British soldiers who died being killed between 1971–73. In 1972 alone, the IRA killed 100 British soldiers and wounded 500 more. In the same year, they carried out 1,300 bomb attacks and 90 IRA members were killed.)

=== Blanket and dirty protests ===
IRA volunteer Kieran Nugent had been interned in Long Kesh in 1974, but when he was arrested and convicted in 1976, he faced a very different prison regime. On 14 September, he was the first republican to be convicted since the withdrawal of status. As such he was required to wear a prison uniform as every other, non-political, prisoner did. Nugent refused, telling the warder, "If you want me to wear a uniform, you'll have to nail it to my back", and wore a blanket in its place. This began the blanket protest, in which IRA and Irish National Liberation Army (INLA) prisoners refused to wear prison uniforms and either went naked or fashioned garments from prison blankets. In 1978, after a number of clashes between prison officers and prisoners leaving their cells to wash and "slop out" (empty their chamber pots), this escalated into the dirty protest, where prisoners refused to wash and smeared their excrement on the walls of their cells. The scholar Begoña Aretxaga has suggested that, unlike the hunger strike which followed, "the Dirty Protest had no precedent in the political culture". The protest soon spread to the women's prison at Armagh, where not just faeces and urine but menstrual blood coated cell walls. These protests aimed to re-establish the political status expected by prisoners of war and were encapsulated in what became known as the "Five Demands":

1. The right not to wear a prison uniform;
2. The right not to do prison work;
3. The right of free association with other prisoners, and to organise educational and recreational pursuits;
4. The right to one visit, one letter and one parcel per week;
5. Full restoration of remission lost through the protest. (Note: The last demand was a later addition; at the time of the 'Smash H-Block' conference, the demands comprised the first four.)

Initially, the dirty protest did not attract a great deal of attention, and even the IRA regarded it as a side issue in the context of the armed struggle. It began to attract attention when Tomás Ó Fiaich, the Roman Catholic Archbishop of Armagh, visited the prison and condemned the conditions there. O'Fiaich subsequently told the press, "I was shocked at the inhuman conditions prevailing in H-Blocks ... The stench and filth in some of the cells, with the remains of rotten food and human excreta scattered around the walls was almost unbearable. In two of them I was unable to speak for fear of vomiting." In 1979, former MP Bernadette McAliskey stood in the election for the European Parliament on a platform of support for the protesting prisoners and won just under 34,000 votes, even though Sinn Féin had called for a boycott of the election, (Note: Sinn Féin were not against elections per se; as the author F. Stuart Ross points out, "the very issues of An Phoblacht/Republican News that condemned the McAliskey campaign had asked readers to support Sinn Féin candidates in twenty-six county local elections".) and on one occasion, Martin McGuinness heckled her with a megaphone during a public meeting. Other republicans believed that her standing would be a diversion from the military campaign, and the Maze prisoners released a statement emphasising that, in their collective opinion, only physical force could remove the British.

Although McAliskey had stood solely on a prisoner's rights ticket, there was no intention of turning the popular support the campaign had exposed into an organised movement at that time. However, the dirty protests had now lasted nearly three years, and morale inside was felt to be dangerously low. One ex-blanketman recalled that "the more experienced men spoke for the rest of us when they said they were nearly at the end of their tether". Shortly after this, a "Smashing H-Block" conference took place in West Belfast in October 1979. Over 600 people, from many republican or left-wing organisations attended. This led to the formation of the broad-based National H-Block/Armagh Committee on a platform of support for the "Five Demands", and included seasoned activists such as McAliskey, Eamonn McCann and Miriam Daly.

The period leading up to the hunger strike saw assassinations by both republicans and loyalists. The IRA shot and killed a number of prison officers, while loyalist paramilitaries shot and killed a number of activists in the National H-Block/Armagh Committee. These included a UFF gun attack which badly injured McAliskey and her husband, the assassination of Miriam Daly by the UDA while her house was under military observation, and, of the Irish Independence Party, John Turnley's death at the hands of the UVF.

== 1980 hunger strike ==
With the three-year anniversary of the dirty protest approaching in 1979, the prisoners presented a proposal for a hunger strike to the external leadership. Although this was rejected—former prisoner Laurence McKeown has said this proposal was "unknown to most prisoners"—the external leadership "conceded, reluctantly" that they had no alternative proposal. In June 1980, the European Court of Human Rights (ECHR) rejected a claim by the prisoners that their treatment during imprisonment was against the Convention on Human Rights on the grounds that the dirty protest was self-inflicted. On 27 October 1980, republican prisoners in the Maze began a hunger strike. The strike garnered 148 volunteers, but a total of seven were selected to match the number of men who signed the Easter 1916 Proclamation of the Republic. The group consisted of IRA members Brendan Hughes, Tommy McKearney, Raymond McCartney, Tom McFeely, Sean McKenna, Leo Green, and INLA member John Nixon.

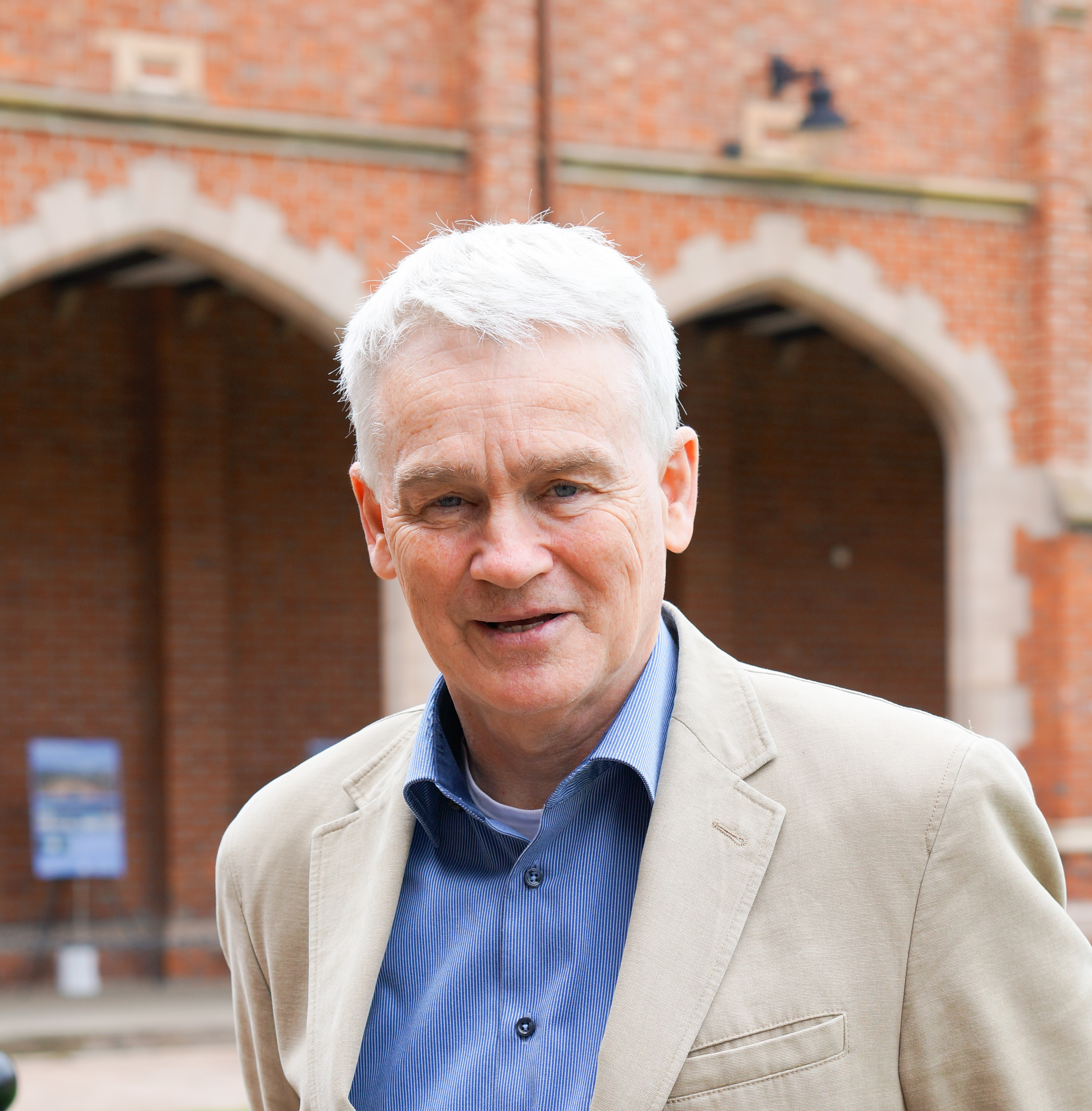
Tommy McKearney, who took part in the blanket protest, dirty protest and 1980 hunger strike

On 1 December, three prisoners in Armagh Women's Prison joined the strike. These were Mairéad Farrell (age 23), Mary Doyle (24) and Mairéad Nugent (21); Farrell stated that the intention was to "create an additional source of pressure on the authorities". In four days, their average weight loss was 9 pounds (4.1 kg). They were moved to a single clean cell two days after beginning and were in a stable condition. In the Maze, the seven men were in the prison hospital where they were weak but generally stable, except for McKenna and McKearney, who deteriorated faster than their comrades. They remained defiant, however, and refused to accept less than the settlement of the Five Demands. The British government, while offering extensive prison reform, refused to acknowledge political status. The women's strike lasted nineteen days, finishing on 19 December. Twenty-six women remained on the dirty protest at Armagh. Token three-day fasts broke out sporadically in Belfast Prison. In a war of nerves between the IRA leadership and the government, with McKenna lapsing in and out of a coma and on the brink of death, the government appeared to concede the essence of the prisoners' five demands. The republicans were unsure whether the British position of refusing to negotiate could itself be a negotiating position, although this was emphatically denied by the Northern Ireland Office. The situation escalated on 15 December when twenty-three more prisoners joined the Maze strike. McKenna was by now gravely ill, and McKearney close behind; the eyesight of both had deteriorated.

Following "intense" and "highly secret" negotiations involving the Irish Government, the British clarified their position in a thirty-page document detailing a proposed settlement, which touched on many of the demands, although without conceding any. With the document in transit to Belfast, Hughes—having already been informed that rights to free association and to their own clothing had been granted, which he deemed 'close' to what they wanted—took the decision to save McKenna's life and end the strike after fifty-three days on 18 December. (Note: In an interesting corollary, on 12 December, six UDA men in the Maze also began a hunger strike for the same five demands as the republican prisoners but also including a demand for segregation from them. The British considered it "ostensibly a publicity stunt and that the participants had no intention of killing themselves".) Later, however, Hughes stated that the reason he called it off was purely to save McKenna's life and explicitly not because he expected British concessions or a prisoners' victory. Sands believed that the strikers "were beat [sic] by a few lousy hours". The final British offer made no promises but gave assurances that the government "will, subject to the overriding requirements of security, keep prison conditions—and that includes clothing, work, association, education, training and remission—under continuing review".

== 1981 hunger strike ==
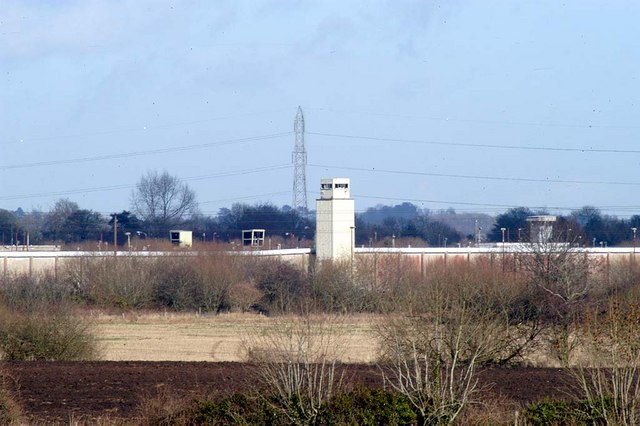
Maze prison outside of Belfast where the hunger strike took place

By January 1981, it became clear that the prisoners' demands had not been conceded. The republican movement—"unconvincingly", argues Kelly—blamed Britain, insisting that Thatcher had reneged on her promises. Instead, for example, of the right to their own clothes, which the prisoners believed had been conceded them, it became clear that they would have to wear prison-issued clothes until they could demonstrate full compliance with the regime. Sands saw this as "a demand for capitulation rather than a step-by-step approach", argues O'Dochartaigh, and began pressuring the external leadership to authorise another hunger strike. The investigative author R. K. Walker has reported one member of British Intelligence as believing that

The British government duped the IRA into believing the prisoners' demands had been granted. He said the British government deliberately created a state of confusion among the hunger strikers by moving McKenna, who was close to death, to a hospital outside the prison. He said this had the effect of creating uncertainty within his colleagues, who would not know if he was about to die or had died.

Walker's source argues that this was a Pyrrhic victory for the government, as it heightened the resolve of the prisoners in the event of another hunger strike. Prison authorities began to supply the prisoners with officially issued civilian clothing, as had been announced. The Secretary of State, Humphrey Atkins, had already begun preparations for dealing with a second hunger strike based on the lessons of the first one. These included the behaviour of the military, close liaison between the NIO and Belfast community and church leaders, with the Irish government, and the attitude of the United States. In Dublin, the Irish Taoiseach, Charles Haughey recommended the British continue the strategy of "a good mixture of ingenuity, subtlety and sensitivity" that had served them the previous year.

On 4 February, the prisoners issued a statement saying that the British government had failed to resolve the crisis and declared their intention of "hunger striking once more". The prisoners gradually wound down the dirty protest, requesting baths and shaving and allowing themselves to be moved to new cell blocks. The blanket protest continued. The seven volunteers who had recently ended their hunger strike publicly announced their support for another, although Sands was still concerned at this point that the external leadership might veto a strike. The leadership did not, in fact, and desperately sent in comms attempting to dissuade Sands from another hunger strike. But Sands intended to "send a clear signal to his own superiors that he 'meant business'". The second hunger strike began on 1 March, when Bobby Sands, the IRA's former officer commanding (OC) in the prison, refused food. (Note: Sands had taken over from Brendan Hughes as OC when Hughes commenced his hunger strike.) The date was deliberately chosen as the fifth anniversary of the withdrawal of status. A statement from the prisoners was issued by Danny Morrison, Sinn Féin's publicity director:

We have asserted that we are political prisoners and everything about our country, our arrests, interrogations, trials, and prison conditions, show that we are politically motivated and not motivated by selfish reasons or for selfish ends. As further demonstration of our selflessness and the justness of our cause a number of our comrades, beginning today with Bobby Sands, will hunger-strike to the death unless the British government abandons its criminalization policy and meets our demand for political status.

I am standing on the threshold of another trembling world. May God have mercy on my soul. My heart is very sore because I know that I have broken my poor mother's heart, and my home is struck with unbearable anxiety. But I have considered all the arguments and tried every means to avoid what has become the unavoidable: it has been forced upon me and my comrades by four-and-a-half years of stark inhumanity ...

I ate the statutory weekly bit of fruit last night. As fate had it, it was an orange, and the final irony, it was bitter. (Note: Sands kept a diary for the first 17 days of his fast.)

— Excerpt from Sands's diary, 1 March 1981

Before commencing his hunger strike, Sands had designated Brendan McFarlane as O.C. of IRA prisoners. When McFarlane asked why he was chosen instead of Séanna Walsh, Sands is said to have replied: "Séanna is my best mate. When a crisis develops, Séanna will not let me die. You will. You have to”.Sands organised the strike along lines which made his death—and several more—effectively inevitable. Unlike in the first strike, the prisoners joined one at a time and at staggered intervals; Sands started first and was, therefore, almost certain to die, and die first. This was intended to arouse maximum public support and exert maximum pressure on Prime Minister Margaret Thatcher, which the republican movement initially struggled to generate. The Sunday Sands began his strike, 3,500 people marched through West Belfast; this was compared to 10,000 marchers four months previously. Edward Daly, Bishop of Derry, condemned the return to hunger strike as being not "morally justified" while Sands held journalists' interviews from his bed. Food was given to Sands every day, although this was refused. One of Sands's fellow prisoners reported how food would sit there all day, and when it was taken away at night, the warders "would accuse Bobby of having eaten a pea as they had put '130 on the plate and now there are only 129'."

The author and researcher Ed Moloney has argued, on Sands's strategy, that it meant that "if any hunger striker died, the moral pressure on those who followed to continue through to the end was huge. The fast also guaranteed that if there were deaths, the North would be pitched into a crisis every fortnight or so until the end. As an instrument for destabilizing political life in Ireland, it was beyond historical comparison."

On 5 March, Thatcher flew to Belfast for a lightning visit, in an attempt to reassure the Protestant community of the government's continuing commitment to the Union. She denied it was a response to the latest hunger strike, saying "it ought to be as natural for the Prime Minister to visit this part of the United Kingdom as for her ... to visit Lancashire or Kent", and that she wished to build a "healthy and harmonious society" in the north. She summarised the government's philosophy in a speech before leaving:

Once again we have a hunger-strike at the Maze Prison in the quest for what they call political status. There is no such thing as political murder, political bombing or political violence. There is only criminal murder, criminal bombing and criminal violence. We will not compromise on this. There will be no political status.

However, she also seems to have not held the prisoners themselves responsible for their actions, and even regret, at their forthcoming deaths:

I cannot interfere with the hunger strike; we do not force feed. If those people continue with the hunger strike it will have no effect whatsoever. It will just take their own lives for which I will be profoundly sorry because I think it is a ridiculous thing to do, that it is a ridiculous way to try to go about."

Ten days later, Sands was joined by Francis Hughes. On the 22nd, Raymond McCreesh and Patsy O'Hara began their fasts. The British strategy, at first, was to wait it out and allow time to collapse the strike as it had done in 1980. In the meantime, though, "the strike was quickly overtaken by other events" outside Belfast.

=== Fermanagh and South Tyrone by-election ===
On the same day Thatcher visited the north, Independent Republican "unity" MP for Fermanagh and South Tyrone Frank Maguire died, resulting in a by-election. (Note: Maguire himself was a former IRA man who had been interned during the Border Campaign, had never made his maiden speech in Westminster, but has frequently visited—and was an outspoken supporter of—the prisoners' campaign.) According to McAliskey, it was already intended that Sands should win Maguire's seat. She later told how Frank was going to make his first speech in Westminster announcing his resignation. There was debate among nationalists and republicans regarding who should contest the election: Austin Currie of the Social Democratic and Labour Party expressed an interest, as did McAliskey and Maguire's brother Noel.

After negotiations, they agreed not to split the nationalist vote by contesting the election. This was unpopular in the SDLP, whose ex-leader Gerry Fitt—until 1978, the party's only MP and now a Unity MP—criticised the SDLP for abstaining, and Currie himself later said he was "extremely angry and frustrated" not to have been chosen as his party's candidate. Sands thus stood as an Anti H-Block candidate and had a clear run against Ulster Unionist Party candidate Harry West. Sands was allowed to stand under the Criminal Law Act 1967, which allowed convicted criminals to be elected. (Note: Unless convicted of High Treason.) The election took place on 9 April, and following a high-profile campaign, Sands was elected to the British House of Commons with 30,492 votes to West's 29,046, amounting to over 52% of the vote. The result "gravely alarmed" the government, which almost immediately began looking at ways of disqualifying the new MP. (Note: The House of Commons considered expelling Sands, but legal advice instructed that he was "legally entitled to election and that those who voted for him knew that he was and would remain in custody".) It also alarmed the unionist community, to whom Sands was merely a convicted terrorist. An Enniskillen councillor protested that Fermanagh unionists were "astounded" that the Catholic community elected Sands as they did. Harry West said afterwards, "Now we know the types of people who are living among us". The Anti-H Block cause received a profile boost: now that a British MP might starve to death, Bowyer Bell says, "the international media began to arrive". The New York Times described the result as "a stunning blow to the Protestant establishment of Northern Ireland" and that it "cast into doubt the view often expressed by politicians in London that the IRA is supported only by a fringe of the Catholic voters". For its part, the Irish Times also reported the election as "a serious embarrassment to the British Government" and a "body blow for those who claimed that most Nationalists would not support paramilitary organisation". The Times, meanwhile, concentrated on whether it was possible to remove Sands from office, and noted that, in any case, "even if he is allowed to keep his seat, he is likely to be dead of starvation soon".

Sands's election victory raised hopes that a settlement could be negotiated, but Thatcher stood firm in refusing to give concessions to the hunger strikers. She stated, "We are not prepared to consider special category status for certain groups of people serving sentences for crime. Crime is crime is crime; it is not political". In the blaze of the world's cameras, several intermediaries visited Sands in an attempt to negotiate an end. These included three Irish MEPs, Síle de Valera—granddaughter of Éamon de Valera—Neil Blaney and John O'Connell, as well as Pope John Paul II's personal envoy, John Magee. Several European Commission of Human Rights (ECHR) officials also sought a meeting with Sands, but he refused unless representatives of the IRA and Sinn Féin could attend, and this the Maze authorities could not allow. Labour MP Roy Mason also visited Sands in order to tell him that when he died, he would get no sympathy or recognition from the British labour movement. This appears to have alienated moderate Catholics, however. With Sands close to death, the government's position remained unchanged, with Secretary of State for Northern Ireland Humphrey Atkins stating that "If Mr Sands persisted in his wish to commit suicide, that was his choice. The Government would not force medical treatment upon him." Sands died in the early hours of 5 May 1981; Hughes was two weeks behind him and the next two a week behind Hughes. Small-scale rioting broke out almost immediately, particularly in the interface area of New Barnsley. The Gaelic Athletic Association was condemned by an Irish Republican Socialist Party councillor for banning anti-H Block activity on its premises.

=== Other elections ===
Sinn Féin had traditionally abstained from electoral politics, seeing it as reinforcing colonial rule in the north and an illegal and illegitimate process in the south. Local elections in the south were contested, but although there were increasing calls for this approach to be expanded to the north, the most recent attempt—in November 1980—was voted down at the party's Ard Fheis. (Note: Albeit that this was more on the grounds of tactics and resources rather than the principle itself.) The death of Sands necessitated another by-election in Fermanagh and South Tyrone. This time the Anti-H Block candidate was Owen Carron, Sands's election agent. Held on the day Devine died, Carron won the by-election with an increased number of votes. The increasing electability of republican candidates worried the Irish government. Anti-H Block candidates won over 40,000 first preference votes at the 1981 Irish general election, and elected two prisoners to the Dáil, Paddy Agnew to Louth and hunger striker Kieran Doherty in Cavan-Monaghan. Neither took their seat. Joe McDonnell narrowly missed election in Sligo–Leitrim. The election victories of Doherty and Agnew denied power to Charles Haughey's outgoing Fianna Fáil government, which lost their narrow majority.

Gerry Adams saw these results primarily as a warning to the next Irish government to "move on the prisoners' demands". There were also local elections in Northern Ireland on 20 May, although Sinn Féin did not contest them. Some smaller groups and independents who supported the hunger strikers gained seats, such as the Irish Independence Party with 21 seats, while the IRSP (the INLA's political wing) and People's Democracy (a Trotskyist group) gained two seats each, and a number of pro-hunger strike independent candidates also won seats. The British government passed the Representation of the People Act 1981 to prevent another prisoner from contesting the second by-election in Fermanagh and South Tyrone, which was due to take place following the death of Sands. On 4 July, the prisoners stated they were not asking for preferential treatment, saying, "We would warmly welcome the introduction of the Five Demands for all prisoners".

== Prisoner communication ==
Until the late 1970s, the blanket protest was effectively a passive one. Because the prisoners would not wear uniforms, they could not come out of their cells, even for Masses or visits. The problem with this all-or-nothing "macho" strategy is that it made communicating with the outside world much harder, and it was difficult to get word out about the conditions they dwelt in. It also undermined morale, both in the Maze and on the outside. The situation changed with the arrival of Brendan Hughes in the H Block; Hughes, supported by Sands, advocated coming out of cells, not just to improve their own existence but, more importantly, to allow them to take advantage of the opportunities visits presented for smuggling. The Adams/Hughes stratagem also made prison protests more sustainable in the long term. It also improved internal and external communications, the weaknesses of which had been exposed in the first hunger strike, when Sands and Hughes could not meet, and there was little up-to-date information being shared. Internally, prisoners in one wing could generally shout to another wing, especially at night. Other methods they developed were creative, such as tying items onto a blanket-thread string, tying the other end to a button, and then "shooting the button" across the corridor under cell doors.

External communication was maintained via prison visits. These allowed the prisoners to send out letters and receive items from the outside, such as ball point refills, cigarette papers—for both smoking and writing on—tobacco, and quartz crystal radios. For smuggling goods and letters, the prisoners' mouths and body cavities provided not just a practical method of importation but another act of resistance against the prison regime. Cavities for the Maze prisoners included rectal, throat and nasal passages, as well as within foreskins and navels. One prisoner became known as "The Suitcase" on account of how much he could carry inside him, while another set a record with 40 comms under his foreskin. The long-term effect of the change of prisoner strategy and the opening up of lines of communication in 1978 was that, three years later, the world now had a thorough, if a third party, knowledge of conditions inside the Maze, due to the volume of information that had previously come out.

David Beresford, a Northern Ireland correspondent for The Guardian in 1981, researched the methods the prisoners used to collect equipment, as the H Blocks had been designed to constrain prisoners' communications. Although the prisoners had the final say on who visited them—they had to send their VOs to the governor—they were generally expected to accept the recommendations of the Army Council, which was interested in maximising the number of couriers available. If possible, these couriers—nearly all of them women—would also be family or friends of the prisoner. They brought and received comms. These were tiny letters, written on cigarette papers and wrapped in clingfilm during transportation, either internally or under clothing: "The system became so efficient that on occasion the external leadership could expect to get a message in, a reply out and a second message back in in a single day".

== Continuing violence ==
=== Paramilitary activity ===
Even before Sands's death, pro-prisoner violence was occurring. British businessman Geoffrey Armstrong of British Leyland was giving a speech to the Dublin Junior Chamber of Commerce when three balaclavad men shot him in the legs while shouting, "This action is in support of the H-Blocks". The IRA denied responsibility. Violence was not confined to the IRA. Other incidents included the shooting and wounding of UDA councillor Sam Millar at home on Shankill Road by the INLA. There were retaliatory UDA killings in Belfast; an RUC officer was blown up by a car bomb, and a woman in Derry was assassinated while collecting census forms door to door. The IRA released a statement that attacks on security services would increase. The first paramilitary victim following Sands's death was Constable Peter Ellis, who was shot by the IRA on 6 May in New Lodge. The following day James Power, INLA, was blown up by his organisation's own bomb near his home in the Markets area. The Lost Lives project has calculated that around 50 people lost their lives in the period between the death of Sands and the taking off of Devlin. Following Hughes's death, the Irish country homes of James Comyn, a British High Court judge, and Lord Farnham, were burned out by the IRA, and in Belfast, the night before his burial, there were seven shooting incidents and an explosion. Two days later, Constable Stephen Vallely died when an RPG hit his Land Rover; he was the first RUC to be killed in a rocket attack. Attacks on security forces continued and became more intense when there was a burial. Soldiers were killed by a landmine in Newry; a police officer was shot outside a pub; reservist Colin Dunlop was shot in the Royal Victoria Hospital, the conflict's first Mormon casualty. Further hunger striker deaths were met with further street violence; following the death of O'Hara, for example, the police were attacked, and a man was killed by a plastic bullet.

The IRA killed 13 policemen, 13 soldiers—including five members of the UDR—and five civilians. The seven months were one of the bloodiest periods of the Troubles, with a total of 61 people killed, 34 of them civilians. Prison officers became a favoured target by the IRA: eighteen had been killed in the run-up to and duration of the first hunger strike, as well as two prison governors, including Albert Mills in 1978. This was the republican movement's means of upping the ante against a relatively soft target. Former IRA prisoner Richard O'Rawe has argued that, from the perspective of the prisoners, prison staff waged a campaign of violence against them, including beatings and testicular squeezings.

=== Funerals ===
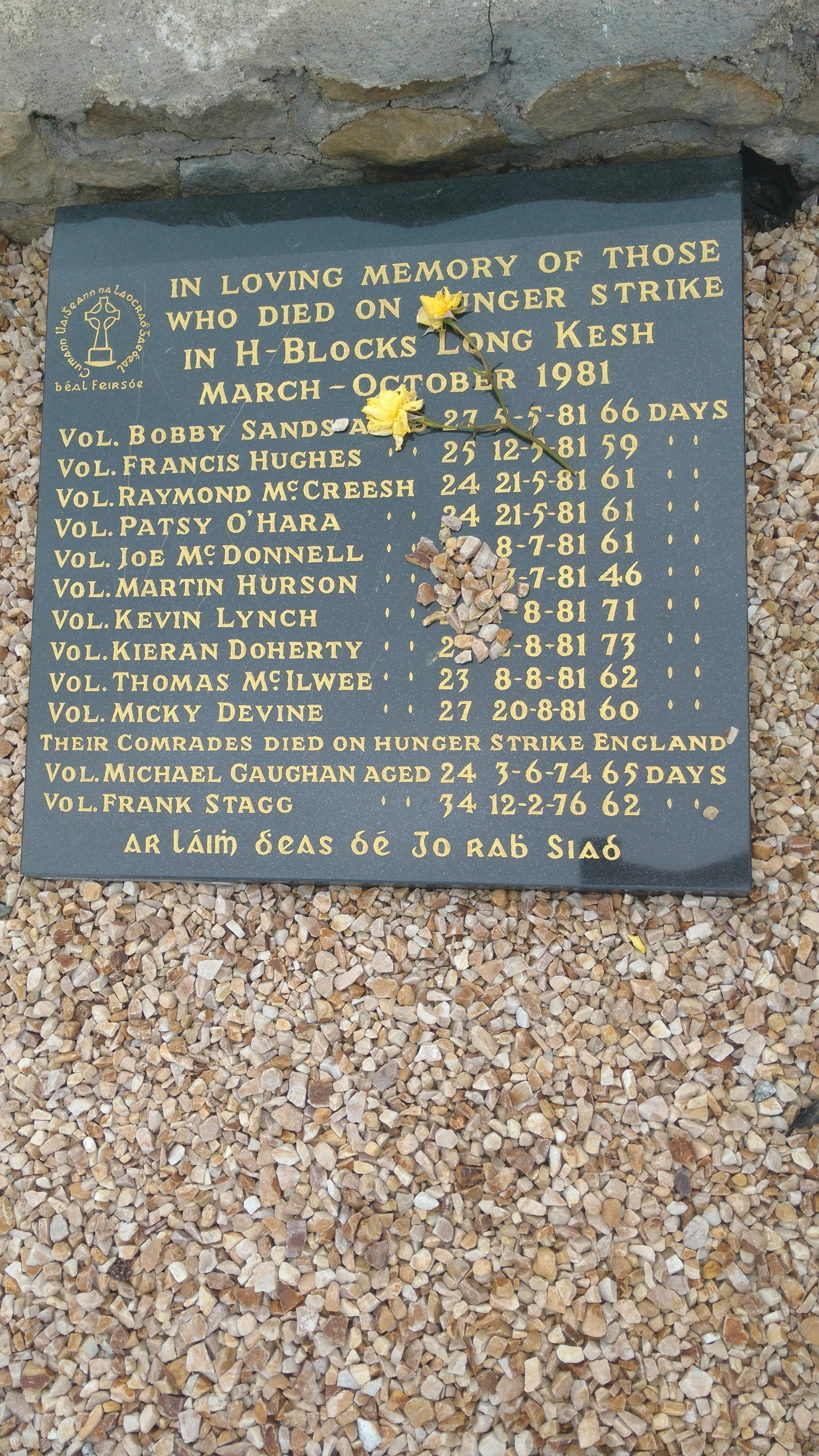
Memorial for those who died in the hunger strikes at Milltown Cemetery in Belfast

By late April, with Sands on the verge of death, the British government was making plans to deal with the popular consequences. Atkins briefed Thatcher that not only were thousands expected to turn out for Sands's funeral, but large-scale rioting was expected. The RUC's main priority was to prevent demonstrators from entering Protestant areas, which were already being spoken of as defended by Protestant paramilitaries. Although Sands's funeral—attended by around 100,000 people—on 7 May passed off peacefully, that night, violence broke out across Belfast; security forces were attacked with acid and petrol bombs. Ten thousand people attended the funeral of Francis Hughes, which took place "not without some controversy", argues Hennessey. The Times's Northern Ireland correspondent Chris Ryder described an "undignified chase" across South Belfast after his body was handed over to his family. The family, and the wider republican movement, wanted the remains to be taken via the Falls Road and Toomebridge—where receptions had been laid on—whereas the RUC had directed it be taken from the Maze to his place of burial, Bellaghy. The police considered any other route—which would have to march past Protestant areas—too dangerous for both security forces and civilians. (Note: Further, reports Ryder, the IRA had taken over St Agnes's, on Andersonstown Road for the remains to rest, against the wishes of the parish priest.) As such it was decided to give Hughes a police convoy, although the chief constable, Jack Hermon, was "less certain than one would like" of the exact statutory powers under which the force did so.

Hermon's priority for the future was that—however many more funerals there might be—the IRA would not be in control. Both McCreesh's and O'Hara's funerals were accompanied by paramilitary colour parties, speeches and other trappings. The former passed without incident, but O'Hara's descended into rioting. Next to die, McDonnell's funeral experienced some of the worst violence yet. The British Army, through an airborne observation post, attempted to arrest the IRA firing party that had volleyed over the coffin, and this led to rioting when the crowd stopped them. Walker argues this was a tactical decision by the government, and "gave the authorities a chance to demonstrate that there would be no let up in their battle against the IRA—not in jail, not on the streets and not at funerals". Black flags were flown from nationalist homes: these were intended to express both grief and anger towards the government, but they also contained an implicit threat towards those deemed the strikers' opponents.

== Response ==
=== British–Republican negotiations ===
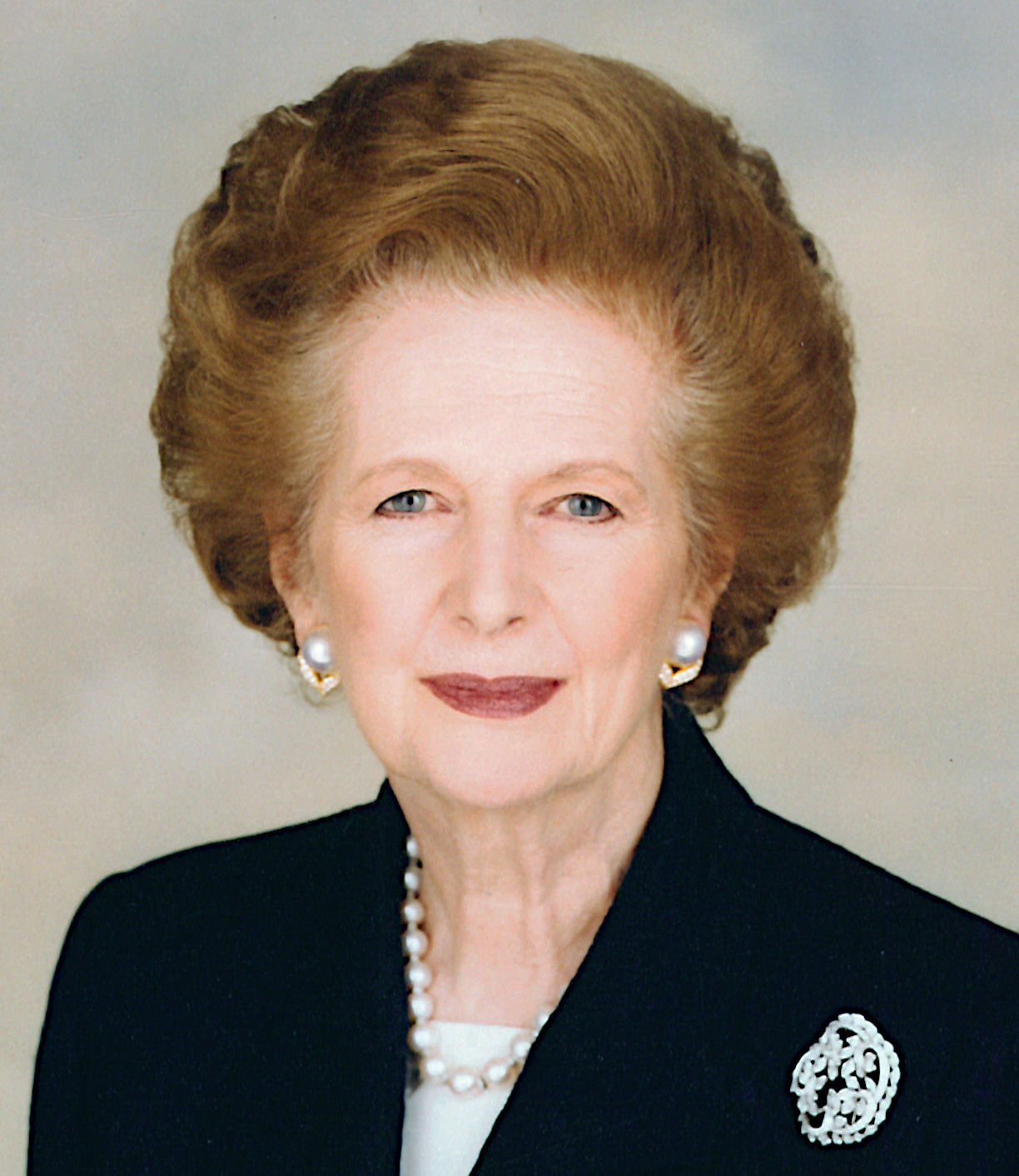
1990s photo of Margaret Thatcher, then-former UK prime minister

Despite Thatcher's oft-repeated mantra that she "did not talk to terrorists", historians agree that the British government had been negotiating with elements of the IRA since 1972, when the first ceasefire was arranged between Willie Whitelaw and a delegation including Martin McGuinness, Gerry Adams and IRA chief-of-staff Seán Mac Stíofáin. The same occurred with church-backed talks in 1974–1975. Historians and political observers are also aware that "behind closed doors she did authorize discussions with the Irish Republican movement". This back-channel line of communication between the IRA Army Council and the higher echelons of the British government was "painstakingly created" in 1972 and involved many of the same individuals for the next 20 years. It was known about by the prime minister and overseen by MI6. However, it was complicated by the fact that when the talks with Whitelaw had been exposed in the tabloids, he had banned further direct communications. Thomas Hennessey has argued that the Prime Minister's "hand was literally all over the 'deal'" accepted by Hughes in December 1979, and the speed with which the government were able to present a working hypothesis to Brendan Hughes in the Maze—regardless of its acceptability—told the republican movement that the British were, in fact, willing and able to negotiate. Morrison admitted that the British were "taking a big risk here, dealing with us, because that alone is a huge story—'you shouldn't talk to these people', and here you are, flying somebody over".

Kenneth Stowe—at the time Permanent Under-Secretary of State of the NIO—later said that Thatcher was "fully aware" of the necessity in negotiating with Sinn Féin (Note: Which Thatcher considered analogous to negotiating with the IRA Army Council directly.) if one wished to settle Northern Irish affairs. According to Thatcher's biographer, Charles Moore, Adams and McGuinness wanted to bring the hunger strike to an end but required something to take back to the republican movement which demonstrated British good faith. Moore says that Thatcher allowed Adams to receive some further concessions while rejecting the fundamental premise of status. According to Adams, it was the government who "opened up contact" but then closed it the moment the first hunger strike was called off.

However, lines of communication remained open after the end of the 1980 hunger strike, and were still available on the outbreak of the next. Indeed, soon after her election, Thatcher spoke to US president Jimmy Carter on the telephone in which she stated that her preferred strategy was through "patient and persistent negotiation". Publicly, however, it was a different story. In December 1980, the NIO's PUM, John Blelloch emphasised to a republican contact that there could be no question of negotiations while the strike was ongoing. When Northern Ireland Office (NIO) officials did meet, on occasion, with republicans, these were generally called "exercises in clarification" rather than negotiations. This was so as not to send the wrong message to observers, particularly to unionist leaders. Even so, John Molyneux, leader of the UUP, wondered if the British understood they would "have difficulty" in persuading people that this was all the talks amounted to. Hence the British talked to republicans through third parties, such as members of the religious community, (Note: Churchmen had traditionally been seen as negotiators between the British Army and the IRA since Operation Demetrius; they "lent gravitas, even legitimacy, to republican negotiations with the British". From the British perspective, however, the involvement of religious leaders was not always "particularly helpful".) rather than to Sands or Hughes directly. For example, the Pope's envoy, John Magee, met with Atkins as he did Sands; again, Atkins emphasised that this did not constitute negotiation. To Magee, Sands appeared to understand this, stating that he merely wanted "satisfaction" on the question of the demands. However, the result was that

At the end of the meeting Atkins explained, and Father Magee accepted, that the Secretary of State could not see him again because to do so would risk creating the impression that some form of negotiation was going on. There was no question of negotiation, and Atkins would need to continue to make that quite clear.

Thatcher continued, in public, to maintain her stance that "you can't compromise with violence". Meeting Protestant religious leaders, though, she was prepared to admit that, whatever the public view of the IRA, there was "a lot" of sympathy for their ideals among Catholics. By May, Atkins was enjoining upon Thatcher a policy of responding positively to external proposals—such as from the ECHR—which would also prevent the government from being "sucked into any kind of negotiation". O'Fiaich also believed more input from the ECHR would be useful, and that he and Father Crilly could join them; but again, O'Fiaich emphasised that he was not negotiating. In the event, Thatcher turned the suggestion down in case it looked as though the ECHR were her emissaries.

Privately, contact between the NIO and contacts of the republican leadership continued. In early June 1981, communications were sufficiently advanced for there to be "a rich crop of rumours" circulating in the British press as to whether Thatcher was, in fact, negotiating with the IRA. As a result, the International Committee of the Red Cross (ICRC) threatened to release a statement condemning her government for brinkmanship and requesting that civil servants be allowed openly into the Maze to negotiate. The government was also under increased pressure from senior police echelons and military commanders to take a more conciliatory approach, sufficient for Atkins to urge a change tactics upon Thatcher. The four days before McDonnell does saw intense negotiations. Duddy telephoned Tom, his contact in the shady areas of government when communication lines open, at 2230. This was to advise the British that the prisoners would likely be responding in the next few hours. His next call to Tom—at 0230 the following day—lasted two and a half hours. Duddy attempted to gain as much information on British tactics as he could. The issue of clothing seemed most easily resolvable. By 0500, Duddy had a fair amount of information to take back to the leadership. Morrison took the news into the Maze; Tom phoned Duddy later that afternoon, seeking information on the IRA's likely view. Twenty-four hours and eight lengthy phone calls later, on the evening of 6 July, Atkins, Thatcher, the senior civil servant Philip Woodfield and others met to discuss these reports. Atkins could not afford to appear soft, but in view of the time pressure—McDonnell was by now close to collapse—he suggested to Thatcher that "we should communicate to the PIRA overnight a draft statement" addressing the five demands. Work, for example, would constitute light-weight, domestic tasks or studying for Open University, while association would be dealt with by local supervisory officers. Thatcher edited the draft to reduce its conciliatory tone, signalling that while they might soften their approach to uniform, work and association were not included. Another meeting just past midnight on the 8th saw the same group meet. This time, Atkins suggested resending the earlier proposal but emphasising that in the event of non-acceptance, "the British government would immediately issue an alternative statement". By 0210, McDonnell had gone into a coma, which, at that point, the republican leadership was not aware of, although the government was. Previous prisoners had not died until they had been in a comatose state for around 48 hours, so it is possible that the government thought it had some hours still to negotiate in.

Joe McDonnell died the same early morning as the statement was released, a couple of hours before it was read to the prisoners by the Governor and a civil servant. The external leadership heard of the death on the radio. The prisoners were dismayed at what they saw as government hypocrisy. After weeks of being told that the government would not talk to them, they managed to send in an NIO official hours after McDonnell's death. The prisoners were insisting on open negotiations by the end of July. When pressed on this by the Dublin government, the British response was that "we have always understood the Irish Government to be opposed to all forms of negotiation with subversive organisations ... [so] that is not possible". (Note: O'Dochartaigh has described the detailed sources available for this period; everyone involved was writing something down: We know the details of these contacts from three different sources. Duddy recorded both republican and British positions in his handwritten diary, along with brief personal comments while 'Tom' (Note: Tom was most probably Donald Middleton, a British diplomat, who had been heavily involved in previous government negotiations with paramilitaries—including Loyalists—and had run the MI5 safehouse in Laneside, by Belfast Lough.) wrote detailed reports on the first eight phone calls (over a period of fifty-two hours). We also have detailed records of British government drafts of positions to be conveyed through this channel. The republican leadership’s record of the contacts, including the 'comms' smuggled in and out of the prison, was published in Beresford’s Ten Men Dead in 1987.")

=== International ===
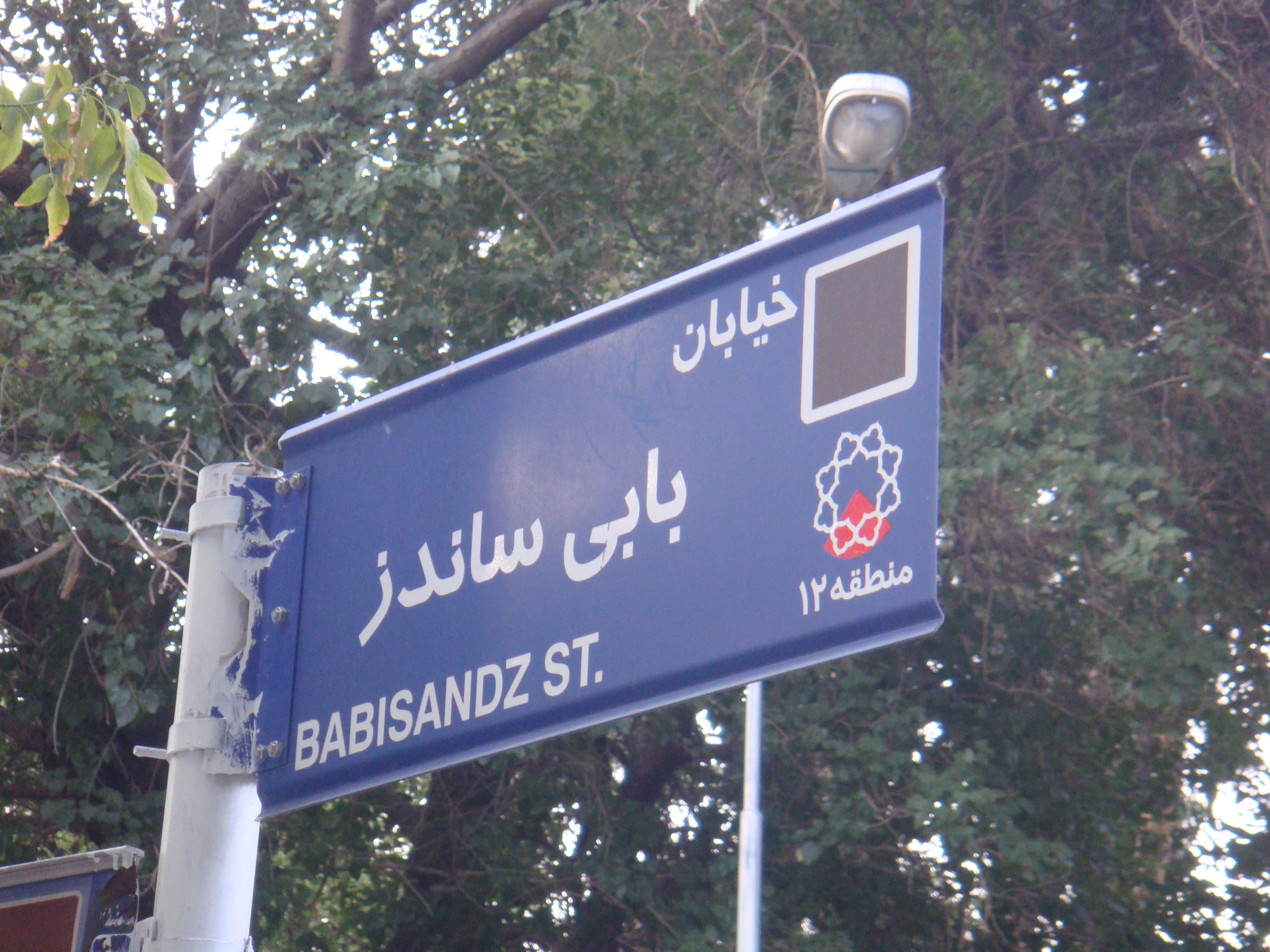
Roadsign for Bobby Sands Street, Tehran

In Ireland, there were demonstrations in many towns, including the burning of Thatcher-style effigies. Vigils were held with paramilitaries attending in some cases, and in Dublin, Gardaí were attacked with petrol bombs. In Lisbon on 7 May, a crowd of several hundred marched on the British Embassy and were addressed by a Sinn Féin speaker, while in Reykjavík, a demonstration outside the embassy condemned Britain for having "savagely attacked the ranks of Irish Freedom Fighters" in a statement. Solidarity leader Lech Wałęsa praised Sands; in Oslo—where Queen Elizabeth II was touring—pro-IRA graffiti appeared; and in India, opposition MPs stood for a minute's silence. A street outside the embassy in Tehran was renamed from Churchill Street to Khiyaban–E Bobby Sands, and members of the Iranian Embassy in London attended Sands's funeral. (Note: The embassy subsequently changed its mailing address to refer to an entrance door around the corner from the main entrance, to avoid having to use the name of Bobby Sands on their letterhead.) Over the course of the strikes, the British government faced increasing international opposition. In France, the Foreign Minister Claude Cheysson talked of the strikers' "supreme sacrifice", and threatened to boycott the royal wedding that July; in response the British Ambassador, Reginald Hibbert, pointed out that it was no different to how the French government treated demands for Corsican independence when it was backed by the FLNC's armed struggle. The French Communist Party praised the strikers in a statement to the embassy, and in New York City, the consulate said they dare not fly the Union Flag for fear it would be stolen and burnt in protest, while in Milan, the Red Brigades firebombed a British Leyland showroom. In France students chanted "L'IRA conquérir", while in Italy 5,000 students burnt union flags. Approximately one thousand people attended a public mass in New York's St Patrick's Cathedral by Cardinal Cooke calling for reconciliation, while also in the city Longshoremen boycotted British ships. In London, the Queen was also met with a banner protesting Sands's "murder" when she opened Wood Green Shopping Centre in North London in May. However, The Washington Post supported Thatcher's position, agreeing with her in an editorial that the safety of the state was at risk. On the death of Doherty, the Dáil's national flag was lowered to half mast as was traditional on the death of a sitting member; he had lasted, at 73 days, the longest yet.

== Deaths and end of strike ==
When, on 5 May, Sands died in the prison hospital on the 66th day of his hunger strike, Humphrey Atkins issued a statement saying that Sands had committed suicide "under the instructions of those who felt it useful to their cause that he should die". More than 100,000 people lined the route of his funeral, which was conducted with full IRA military honours. Margaret Thatcher showed no sympathy for his death, telling the House of Commons that "Mr. Sands was a convicted criminal. He chose to take his own life. It was a choice that his organisation did not allow to many of its victims."

In the two weeks following Sands's death, three more hunger strikers died. Francis Hughes died on 12 May, resulting in further rioting in nationalist areas of Northern Ireland, in particular Derry and Belfast. Following the deaths of Raymond McCreesh and Patsy O'Hara on 21 May, Tomás Ó Fiaich, by then (Catholic) Primate of All Ireland, criticised the British government's handling of the hunger strike. Despite this, Thatcher continued to refuse to negotiate a settlement. She stated, "faced with the failure of their discredited cause, the men of violence have chosen in recent months to play what may well be their last card", during her visit to Belfast in May.

We, the protesting political prisoners in the H-Blocks and the men on hunger strike, have reluctantly decided in this the seventh month of the hunger strike to end our fast. We have been robbed of the hunger strike as an effective protest weapon principally because of the successful campaign waged against our distressed relatives by the Catholic hierarchy, aided and abetted by the Irish establishment (the SDLP and Free State Political Parties) which took no effective action against the British Government and did everything to encourage feelings of hopelessness among our kith and kin. The success of this campaign meant that the British Government could remain intransigent as the crucial political pressure which flows from the threat of death or actual death of hunger strikers was subsiding not increasing.

— Hunger strikers' abridged statement from the Maze, 3 October 1981

Following the deaths of Joe McDonnell and Martin Hurson, the families of some of the hunger strikers attended a meeting on 28 July with Catholic priest Father Denis Faul. The families expressed concern at the lack of a settlement to the priest, and a decision was made to meet with Adams later that day. At the meeting, Father Faul put pressure on Adams to find a way of ending the strike, and Adams agreed to ask the IRA leadership to order the men to end the hunger strike. The following day, Adams held a meeting with six of the hunger strikers to outline a proposed settlement on offer from the British government should the strike be brought to an end. The six men rejected the settlement, believing that accepting anything less than the Five Demands would be a betrayal of the sacrifice made by Sands and the other hunger strikers who had died. Richard O'Rawe has suggested, on this, that by now, "'no compromise' meant 'no strategy'" and that the prisoners were "shackled" by a "frantic desire" to prove that no hunger striker had died in vain. In September 1981, after a cabinet reshuffle, James Prior took over at the NIO. Prior was deputized by Lord Gowrie, later suggested having "quiet admiration for what he saw as the dying men's misguided courage". Prior's and Gowrie's appointments to the Northern Ireland office led to what Hennessey has called a "fissure" in the strike. By now, all parties—British and republican—knew that the impetus for the strike's continuation came from within, not outside of, the Maze. When Doherty died, critics of the strike became louder, and began pointing the finger at individuals such as Adams as having the power to end the strike. The priest who officiated at McElwee's funeral harangued "those that had called the hunger strike" for not ending it: several mourners, including McAliskey, walked out in protest.

== Family interventions ==
Gowrie was in a difficult position. He had to make it clear that government could not act under duress, or while a threat of violence hung over the proceedings. He was clear to the families, at a Stormont meeting on 28 September—a meeting that would have been unthinkable for both sides a few months earlier—that he would negotiate with the prisoners. But he also acknowledged to them that, in his view, there was much that could be done after the strike ended. The families represented McCarville, McElroy, Pickering, Hodgins, Quinn, McMullen and Sheehan. Gowrie was positive to them, although he urged them to make their views known publicly, not just to him. In the meantime, another three strikers—Pickering, Hodging and Devine—joined the fast, although, to some extent, this was soon to be counterbalanced. The first family to intervene in the strike was that of Paddy Quinn, whose mother requested medical support to save his life on 31 July. The following day Kevin Lynch died, followed by Kieran Doherty on 2 August, Thomas McElwee on 8 August and Michael Devine on 20 August. Not every family was willing to intervene. Doherty's family complained that Catholic churchmen had split the families' united front, and rejected their involvement. The prisoners themselves considered that the influence of moderate nationalists was pervasive in their struggle. Devine was the last to die, on the same day as Carron's election victory. Before he went into a coma, Devine rejected medical intervention, telling his sister, "Now, there's to be no needles".

On 4 September, the family of Matthew Devlin approved medical treatment, and he was taken to the Royal Victoria. Two days later, Laurence McKeown's became the fourth family to intervene and ask for medical treatment to save his life; Cahal Daly issued a statement calling on prisoners to end the hunger strike. Liam McCloskey ended his strike on 26 September after his family said they would ask for medical intervention if he became unconscious, and it became clear that the families of the remaining hunger strikers would also intervene to save their lives. The NIO noted these early interventions as the "first major setbacks" in the strike: the impact of the strike was immediately lessened by the increasing likelihood that deaths would be avoided from then on. Bernard Fox was taken off on 24 September (he was "dying too quickly"), and Liam McCloskey took himself off two days later after family told him they would request intervention. Hunger striker John Pickering later recalled realising, by the end of September, that "we were not persuading, and we would not be able to persuade, our families not to intervene". Another striker, Pat McGeown, argues that the families were susceptible because the later round of deaths—"with no apparent critical situation and no crisis situation and no major attempts at negotiation"—seemed to them increasingly pointless.

=== Responses ===
By 2 October it had become apparent that the family of every remaining hunger striker was intending to intervene when it became necessary. The strike was called off at 3:15 pm on 3 October. The time was deliberately chosen by the IRA leadership as the Sunday papers would have already gone to print by then, and the expected tabloid triumphalism would be more muted over 24 hours later. The prisoners' statement, penned by O'Rawe, "keelhauled the Catholic Church, the SDLP and the Dublin government for letting down our fallen comrades". Morrison claimed that it had been "subverted by people within the Irish establishment, by the SDLP, but particularly by the Irish hierarchy who are working on the emotions and putting moral pressure on the understandably distressed relatives". He also argued that the strikes had shown that the government—privately—recognised the IRA as a legitimate anti-imperialist army with whom they would have to negotiate someday. Unsurprisingly, Bernadette Devlin and Adams also both condemned the British government, while O'Fiaich called on the government to show "generosity and compassion".

In Ireland, John Hume also called for a magnanimous gesture from the British, while the Taoiseach called upon the IRA to abandon the armed struggle. In the north, the British Israelite Robert Bradford, of the UUP, accused Britain of making a deal with the IRA and granting them concessions, (Note: Bradford was to be assassinated by the IRA in his constituency surgery the next month.) while his party leader, Molyneux, did not believe that any deals existed, but advised the government against being blackmailed into further concessions. The DUP were also "gravely suspicious" that a deal had been brokered. Thatcher, then in Australia, announced that she was "delighted to hear that this waste of life is at an end". Labour MP Tony Benn criticised the actions of his own party, writing at the time, "I was infuriated that Don Concannon, our Front Bench spokesman on Northern Ireland, should have gone to the Maze prison to interview the hunger strikers and then said on television that the Labour Party agreed 100 per cent with the Government and endorsed everything".

Three days later, Prior announced partial concessions to the prisoners, including the right to wear their own clothes at all times. Recreation was also addressed, with wings now being permitted to mingle in common areas and yards. The only one of the Five Demands still outstanding was the right not to do prison work. Following sabotage by the prisoners and the Maze Prison escape in 1983, the prison workshops were closed, effectively granting all of the Five Demands but without any formal recognition of political status from the government.

== Participants of the 1981 hunger strike ==
The original pathologist's report recorded the hunger strikers' cause of death as "self-imposed starvation". This was later amended to simply "starvation" after protests from the dead strikers' families. The coroner recorded verdicts of "starvation, self-imposed". Although ten men died during the course of the hunger strike, thirteen others began refusing food but were taken off hunger strike, either for medical reasons after intervention by their families or because the strike was called off. Many of them still suffer from the effects of the strike, with problems including digestive, visual, physical and neurological disabilities.

Key
Affiliation		Reason for ending strike			
IRA	INLA	Death	Illness	Family intervention	Strike called off

Name	Paramilitary affiliation	Strike started	Length of strike	Date of strike ending	Reason of strike ending
Bobby Sands	IRA	1 March	66 days	5 May	Died, aged 27.
Francis Hughes	IRA	15 March	59 days	12 May	Died, aged 25.
Raymond McCreesh	IRA	22 March	61 days	21 May	Died, aged 24.
Patsy O'Hara	INLA	22 March	61 days	21 May	Died, aged 23.
Joe McDonnell	IRA	8 May	61 days	8 July	Died, aged 29.
Brendan McLaughlin	IRA	14 May	13 days	26 May	Suffering from a perforated ulcer and internal bleeding
Kieran Doherty	IRA	22 May	73 days	2 August	Died, aged 25.
Kevin Lynch	INLA	23 May	71 days	1 August	Died, aged 25.
Martin Hurson	IRA	28 May	46 days	13 July	Died, aged 24.
Thomas McElwee	IRA	8 June	62 days	8 August	Died, aged 23.
Paddy Quinn	IRA	15 June	47 days	31 July	Taken off by his family
Michael Devine	INLA	22 June	60 days	20 August	Died, aged 27.
Laurence McKeown	IRA	29 June	70 days	6 September	Taken off by his family
Pat McGeown	IRA	9 July	42 days	20 August	Taken off by his family
Matt Devlin	IRA	14 July	52 days	4 September	Taken off by his family
Liam McCloskey	INLA	3 August	55 days	26 September	His family said they would intervene if he became unconscious
Patrick Sheehan	IRA	10 August	55 days	3 October	End of hunger strike
Jackie McMullan	IRA	17 August	48 days	3 October	End of hunger strike
Bernard Fox	IRA	24 August	32 days	24 September	Suffering from an obstructed kidney
Hugh Carville	IRA	31 August	34 days	3 October	End of hunger strike
John Pickering	IRA	7 September	27 days	3 October	End of hunger strike
Gerard Hodgins	IRA	14 September	20 days	3 October	End of hunger strike
James Devine	IRA	21 September	13 days	3 October	End of hunger strike

== Aftermath ==
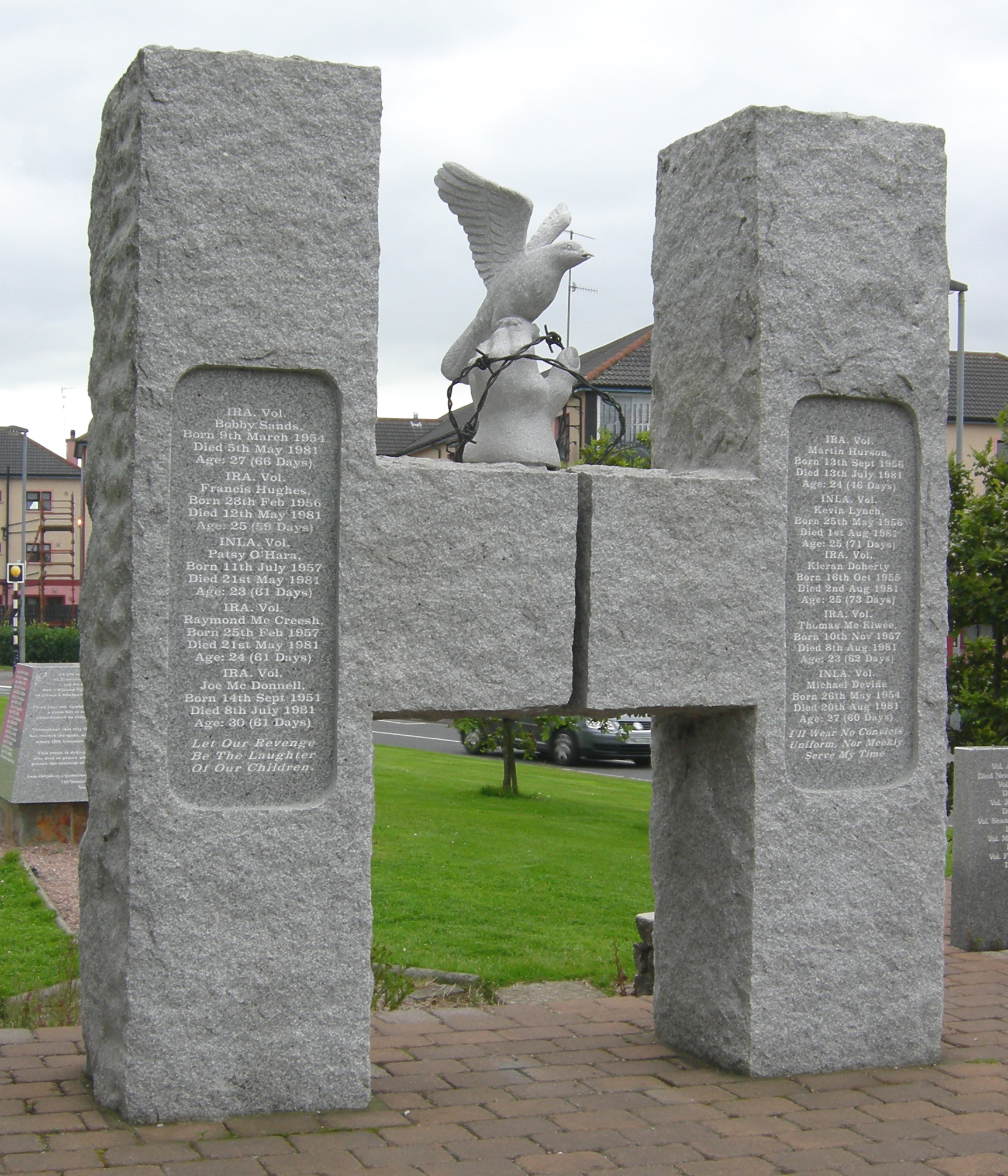
A hunger strike memorial in Derry's Bogside on Free Derry Corner

The British press hailed the hunger strike as a triumph for Thatcher, with The Guardian newspaper stating "The Government had overcome the hunger strikes by a show of resolute determination not to be bullied". At the time most thought the hunger strike a crushing defeat for the republicans, a view shared by many within the IRA and Sinn Féin, but Sands's by-election win was a propaganda victory, and the hunger strike became a Pyrrhic victory for Thatcher and the British government. Richard English argued that Thatcher effectively "breathed life" back into the republican movement in 1981. Sands became a martyr to Irish republicans, while Thatcher became "a republican hate figure of Cromwellian proportions", with Danny Morrison describing her as "the biggest bastard we have ever known". Authors Jack Holland and Henry McDonald have speculated that Thatcher's uncompromising attitude may have stemmed from the death of her close friend and associate Airey Neave, who was assassinated by the INLA in the House of Commons underground car park a few months before her election.

As with internment in 1971 and Bloody Sunday in 1972, IRA recruitment was boosted with the hunger strike, resulting in a new surge of paramilitary activity and galvanising old members back into service. Thatcher's uncompromising stance had alienated much of the nationalist community. This mass mobilisation also had the consequence of strengthening the northern—and younger—leadership of Adams, McGuinness and Morrison against the old guard as represented in Dublin by O'Bradaigh and O'Connell. In contrast with the comparatively peaceful late 1970s, violence surged in the wake of the hunger strike, with widespread civil disorder in Northern Ireland and rioting outside the British Embassy in Dublin. Security forces fired 29,695 plastic bullets in 1981, causing seven deaths, compared to a total of around 16,000 bullets and four deaths in the eight years following the hunger strikes. The government had effectively lost a propaganda war. Professor Robert Savage noted "television images of emaciated Christ-like figures with long hair and beards confined to hospital beds contrasted with the stern countenance of the intransigent prime minister". Historian Ian Miller argues that this kind of imagery was powerful on two levels. Firstly, in representing self-sacrifice, it enabled the narrative to shift from the prisoners' portrayals as terrorists to martyrs, and forced reconsideration of terms such as "terrorist". Secondly, by fermenting the street violence that the hunger strikes did, international attention was drawn to their treatment: "Meanings became attached to Sands's withered body; his corpse became politically encoded. Both his hunger strike and death provided a public spectacle." Irish politics was further polarised, and McKitterick and McVea have argued to great extent:

The hunger strikes had lasting effects, most of which were bad for the authorities and for almost everyone apart from the republican movement ... [they] seared deep into the psyches of large numbers of people, stirring many deep and troubling emotions. Community divisions had always been deep, but now they had a new rawness.

Three years later, the IRA tried to take their revenge on Thatcher with the Brighton hotel bombing, an attack on the Conservative party conference that killed five people and in which Thatcher herself only narrowly escaped death. Yet in her memoirs, 30 years later, Thatcher wrote that she found it possible "to admire the courage of Sands and the other hunger strikers who died but not to sympathise with their murderous cause".

The hunger strike resulted in the republican movement taking public relations more seriously. More importantly, in the long run, it prompted Sinn Féin to move towards electoral politics. Sands's election victory, combined with that of pro-hunger strike candidates in the Northern Ireland local elections and Dáil elections in the Republic of Ireland, gave birth to the Armalite and ballot box strategy. The IRA and Sinn Féin achieved an ideological cohesion they had never before. Adams remarked that Sands's victory "exposed the lie that the hunger strikers—and by extension the IRA and the whole republican movement—had no popular support". The following year, Sinn Féin won five seats in the elections to the Northern Ireland Assembly, and in 1983 Adams won a seat in the UK general election. As a result of the political base built during the hunger strike, Sinn Féin continued to grow in the following two decades. After the 2001 United Kingdom general election, it became the largest nationalist party in Northern Ireland. It has been argued that the hunger strikes are part of a deliberate Sinn Féin tactic of preserving the past in the party's favour: simplified to "a cause, political status, and the recognition of their struggle for a united Ireland", albeit by a "selective and reductive" process. As several groups could claim legitimate heritage from the men of 1981, this made it all the more imperative that Sinn Féin's version became the accepted paradigm.

Internationally, the hunger strikes encouraged similar protests from imprisoned radicals, including members of the ANC on Robben Island, in Diyarbakır in Kurdistan, and Chiapas, Mexico. These were followed by outbreaks from Kurds in Turkish jails and Basques in Spain.

=== Challenge to the Adams/Morrison paradigm ===
Four years later, however, 2005 was a difficult year for the republican movement. What the author R. K. Walker has called a "blitzkrieg of propaganda" erupted just before Sinn Féin contested the 2005 UK general election. New allegations of IRA brutality emerged, including punishment beatings, protection and its role in the Northern Bank robbery of December 2004, and the killing of Robert McCartney in February 2005. These issues were, however, argues Walker, only short-term problems. The same year, allegations were made against the republican leadership which "called into question [its] integrity". These were more serious. Walker continues that, although no one suggests that the author, Richard O'Rawe, chose that particular moment to publish his book, "the timing struck many republicans as unfortunate". O'Rawe questioned the role Adams played in the strike, and whether he manipulated it for political ends. O'Rawe, himself a prisoner and a blanketman, had been the public relations officer inside the prison during the strike. O'Rawe states in his book Blanketmen that Adams prolonged the strike as it was of great political benefit to Sinn Féin and allowed Owen Carron to win Sands's seat:

The hunger strike, ostensibly the climax of the campaign for the restoration of political status, had been cynically manipulated by the republican leadership who allowed prisoners to die in order to promote their political agenda

O'Rawe's argument is effectively that the same offer as was eventually accepted after ten men had died was the same—"or better"—than the prison leadership had supposedly turned down in June, after McDonnell's death, which allegedly offered four out of the five demands. Father Denis Faul had suspected something similar at the time, although this was denied by several hunger strikers and Brendan McFarlane, who was OC inside the prison during the hunger strike. O'Rawe's account has been described by the historian Richard English as "explosive" and by F. S. Ross as "highly contested". O'Rawe claims that he and McFarlane discussed it in Irish and believed it was acceptable on behalf of the prisoners. However, this was rejected in a message from the outside leadership stating that it was insufficient for four men to have already died for. (Note: The message was signed "Brownie"; this was Adams's codename for internal communications.) Those that remained on hunger strike, being unaware of the alleged offer and "weighed down by the deaths of their comrades and the fear that ending the protest in such circumstances would amount to betrayal, they decided to carry on". Richard English also believes that a "substantial British offer was indeed available" before McDonnell's death; the question, he argues is not so much whether the evidence exists but whether it bears the weight of the claim that it was good enough to accept in June 1981. Ed Moloney has also stated that he "believed [O'Rawe's] account from the moment I heard it ... It made complete sense to me". Moloney had been sceptical of the leadership's line at the time, when he was Northern Editor for The Irish Times, that the prisoners were in charge and that the external leadership operated under their didact. Moloney argues that not only did the continued deaths "keep the pot boiling on the streets", but it aligned with a growing body of thought within Sinn Féin that the party should become political and electorally attractive.

O'Rawe's suggestion, however, has been "sharply rejected" by Sinn Féin, says the political journalist Deaglán de Bréadún. McFarlane states O'Rawe's version of events is confused and fragmentary, and states "we were desperate for a solution. Any deal that went some way to meeting the five demands would have been taken. If it was confirmed in writing, we'd have grabbed it ... There was never a deal, there was never a "take it or leave it" option at all". Likewise McKeown has suggested that "Richard has frozen a moment in time", and argues that while there were many hints at offers to come, nothing was in writing, and that at the time "unless it's in writing, it's not an offer". Adams has personally stated that he was effectively impotent over the prisoners' tactics in 1981, later revealing that, when an unnamed hunger striker's father "begged him to do something to save his son, Adams replied 'I can't, but you can'". Although O'Rawe's thesis has not met with universal agreement, the author Andrew Sanders has argued that the existing narrative was "all changed" as a result. O'Rawe's arguments were subsequently backed by a hunger striker, Gerard Hodgins, who told Sanders:

There is sufficient evidence to suggest there was something going on. The accounts coming from Danny Morrison and Bik [McFarlane] have shifted that much since Richard first wrote his book that they should put themselves up for scrutiny just to clear the whole thing up and let people know the truth.

== Commemorations ==
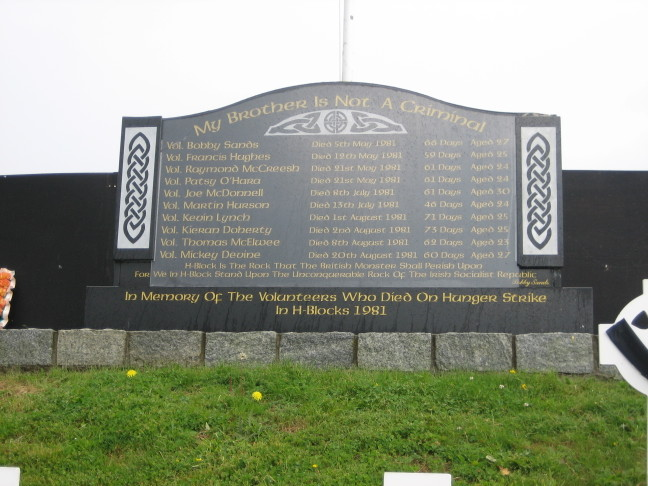
A hunger strike memorial near Crossmaglen, County Armagh

A memorial to the men who died in the Irish Rebellion of 1798, the Easter Rising, and the hunger strike stands in Waverley Cemetery, Sydney, Australia, which is also the burial place of Michael Dwyer of the Society of United Irishmen. In 1997 NORAID's Hartford Unit in the United States dedicated a monument to Sands and the other hunger strikers, "the only one of its kind in America", notes Wharton.

In 2001, Sinn Féin's 20th-anniversary commemoration committee focussed on a diverse range of events. On 3 October 2001—the 20th anniversary of the end of the hunger strike—a memorial was unveiled by Adams, Patrick Sheehan and Ahmed Kathrada, on Robben Island, South Africa. The inscription reads, "To political prisoners who suffered and died as a result of hunger strikes in prison in Ireland and South Africa". In December that year, Adams attended the unveiling of a commemoration to the strikers in Havana, Cuba, which was attended by Fidel Castro, whom Adams thanked for Castro's public support of the hunger strike at the time.

In 2011, Sinn Féin launched a thirty-year anniversary exhibition of the hunger strike at the Linen Hall, Belfast; mild criticism came from one DUP politician, Lord Browne, who emphasised its "highly sensitive" nature. Similar exhibitions were held across the country, involving several different media, and ranging from sculptures by Irish artists to rebuilding a makeshift H-Block cell on the Falls Road but also including more symbolic events, such as tree planting ceremonies.

== Cultural depictions ==
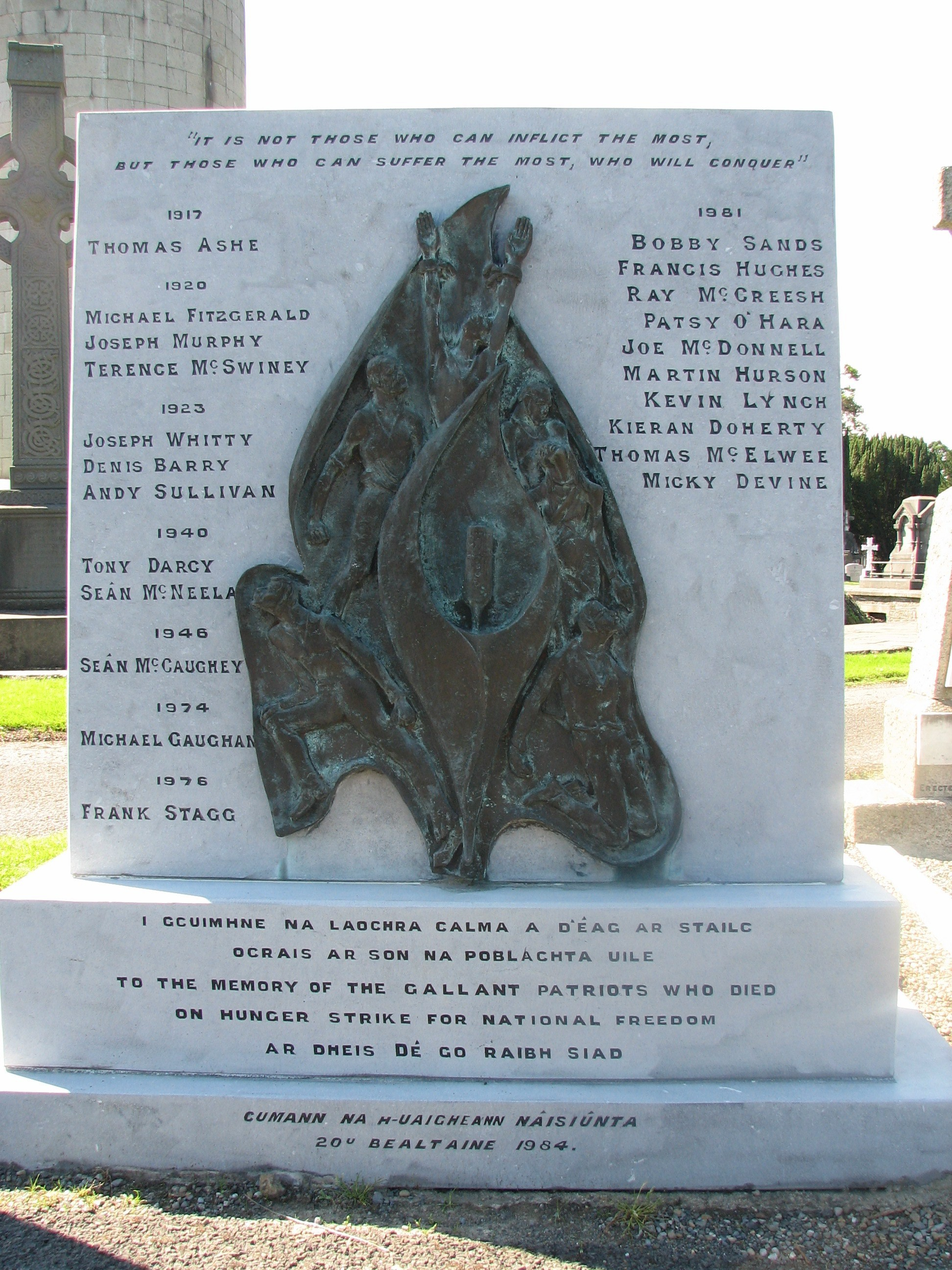
Irish Hunger Strikers Memorial, Glasnevin Cemetery, Dublin

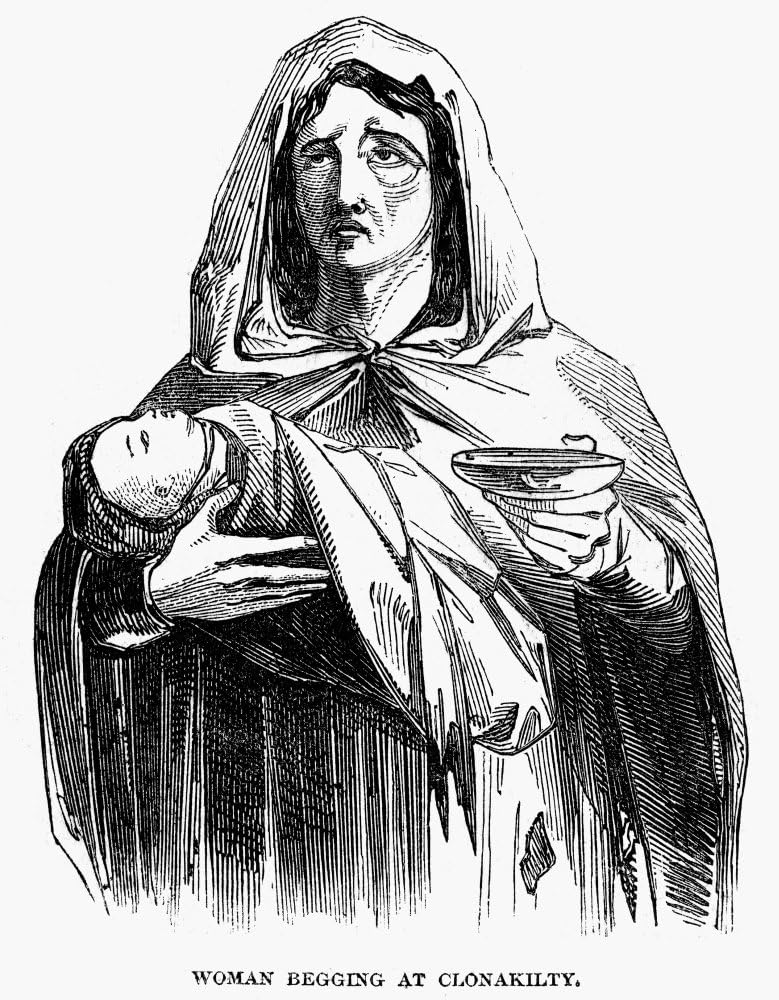
A destitute and begging Irish woman during the Famine, as represented by the London Evening News in 1847

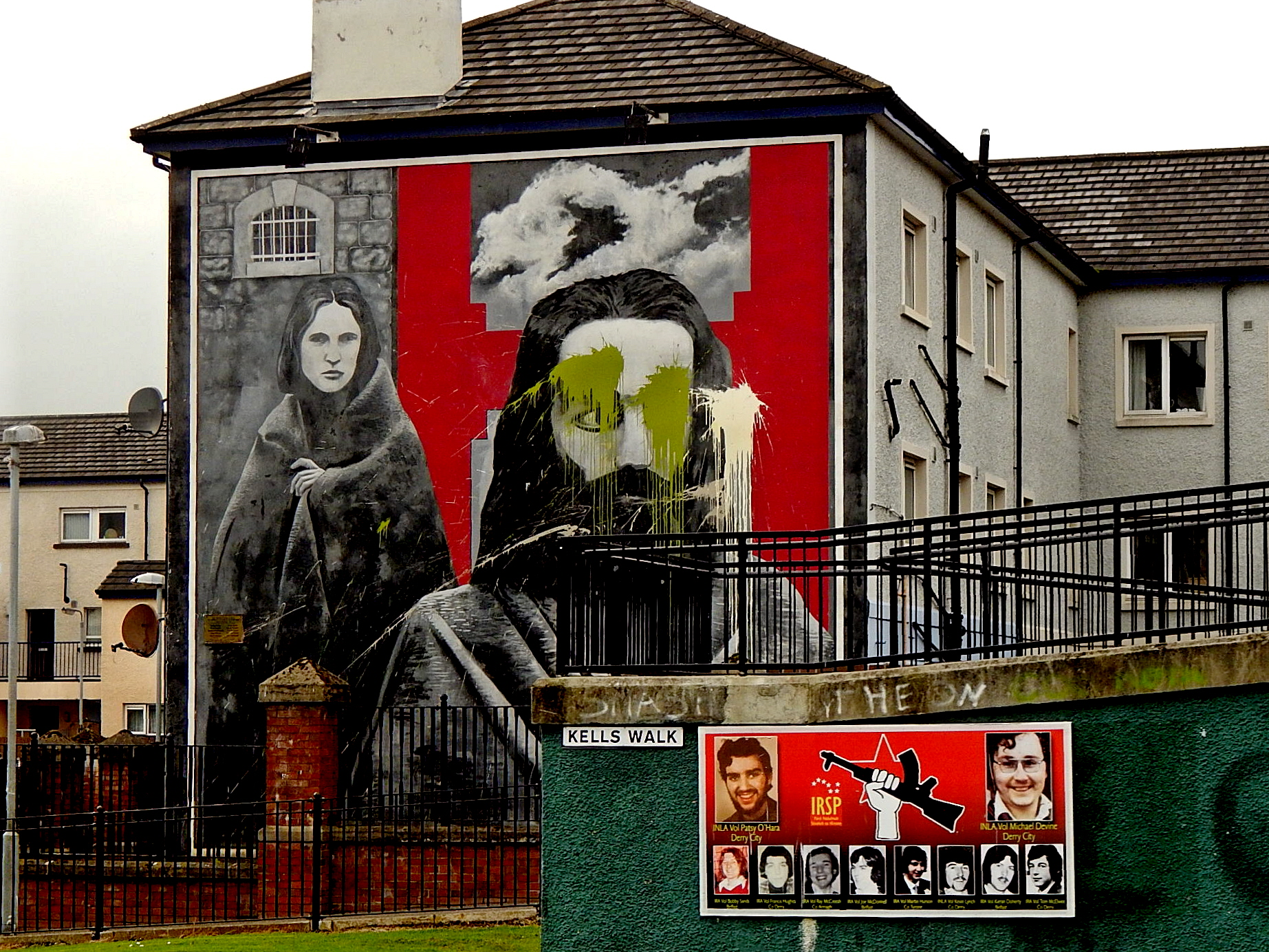
The Bogside Artists' mural of Raymond McCartney as a blanket man accompanied by an unnamed woman in Armagh Gaol

Comparison between McCartney's Rossville Street mural and the London Evening News illustration of a woman in the famine: "McCartney looks off to an undefined point to the right of the frame, while the woman, whose face is not that of a specific Armagh prisoner, confronts the viewer with a steadfast gaze. She too is dressed in a blanket."

There have been many representations of Irish history and politics in culture, and the 1981 hunger strike is no different; many songs and ballads were written during and immediately after the strike. In 1920, during the War of Independence Daniel Corkery, the republican politician, argued that "Any great movement toward a spiritual end, such as Ireland's push for freedom ... endows itself with creative power". This is especially true of hunger striking, where the scholar George Sweeney noted, the "meshing of religious practice with aspirations of nationalism and militant republicanism"; in other words, quasi-religious self-sacrifice and immortality in song. Notable songs in the genre are Francie Brolly’s 'The H-Block Song'—to which Sands's coffin was carried through West Belfast—'Bobby Sands MP', and 'The Time Has Come', which relates the story of O'Hara meeting his mother for the last time. Others include 'Joe McDonnell', on the fifth striker; 'Roll of Honour', on the collective; 'The People's Own MP', on Sands's election; 'Farewell to Bellaghy' and Christy Moore's 'The Boy from Tamlaghtduff', both on Hughes. Moore—a high profile supporter of the H-Block protests—also put to music two of Sands's own compositions, 'I Wish I Was Back Home in Derry' and 'McIlhatton' and released them in his 1986 album, The Spirit of Freedom. In the former, Sands draws direct comparison between the transported revolutionaries of the failed 1803 rebellion with the prison struggles of the present day. When Sands died, the Derry punk group The Undertones were in London recording their song 'It's Going to Happen!' for Top of the Pops. The song was inspired by the hunger strike, and the guitarist wore a black armband.

In visual culture, wall murals—often painted on the gable ends of terraces—have been an important method of communities on both sides of the sectarian divide to transmit history and ideology to the viewer, and statements of resistance. The hunger strikes were no different; indeed, it was from the H-Block and hunger strike that the first murals emerged. One of the first and most significant mural artists, Gerard "Mó Chara" Kelly, was imprisoned in the Maze while the struggles took place, and has acknowledged their influence on his subsequent work. There are memorials and murals in memory of the hunger strikers in towns and cities across Ireland. In the cities, these include Belfast—where a smiling Sands fills an external wall of the Falls Road Sinn Fein office; Dublin, with Yann Goulet's 1983 granite sculpture in Glasnevin Cemetery; and Derry, which gained a new mural in 2000, from the Bogside Artists, depicting local 1980 hunger striker Raymond McCartney as a "Christ-like" figure alongside an anonymous female striker in Armagh, who looks similar to the Irish famine victims as illustrated by the London Evening News at the time. (Note: The political scientist Gerr Kearns has highlighted the similarity, saying how "the gaunt image of the woman, in particular, recalls the famous illustrations of the famine victims in the London Illustrated News, such as the image of the woman begging in Clonakilty from February 1847".) The historian Agnés Maillot has argued that, while films such as H3 and the play Diary of a Hunger Strike were not actually commissioned by Sinn Féin, the party intended the hunger strikes—and the party's dominant role in them—to become "part not just of the Irish political identity, but of the cultural identity as well".

Apart from documentaries (such as BBC NI's 25th anniversary The Hunger Strike, directed by Margo Harkin), the hunger strike has been the background to several major films. For example, Les Blair's H3—co-written by former IRA prisoners Brian Campbell and Laurence McKeown, the latter also a 1981 hunger striker—recounts the events leading up to as well as during the strike, and has been described as both a commemoration and the product of commemoration in the way it treats human memory as historical record. 2001's Silent Grace, from Maeve Murphy tells the story of the republican women on the first hunger strike in Armagh, and stars Orla Brady as the block OC. In 2008 Steve McQueen directed Hunger, starring Michael Fassbender as Sands and Liam Cunningham as Father Dominic Moran. The film is almost completely silent, except for sound effects and occasional dialogue (the first instance of which is 30 minutes into the film). Some Mother's Son, directed by Terry George, starring Helen Mirren, Fionnula Flanagan as the two mothers and Aidan Gillen and David O'Hara as their imprisoned sons. Gerard McSorley plays the mediating and condemnatory Father Daly. The film explores how two mothers, divided by class and politics, respond to their sons' IRA involvement and their joining the hunger strike. Stephen Burke's half-hour '81, set in the final days of Sands's strike, displays the differing viewpoints through two families, one from each side of the political divide.

David Rovics has also written a song on Francis Hughes, a Provisional IRA combatant who died in the 1981 Irish Hunger Strike, in his song "Up The Provos".
