= David Rovics =

American musician

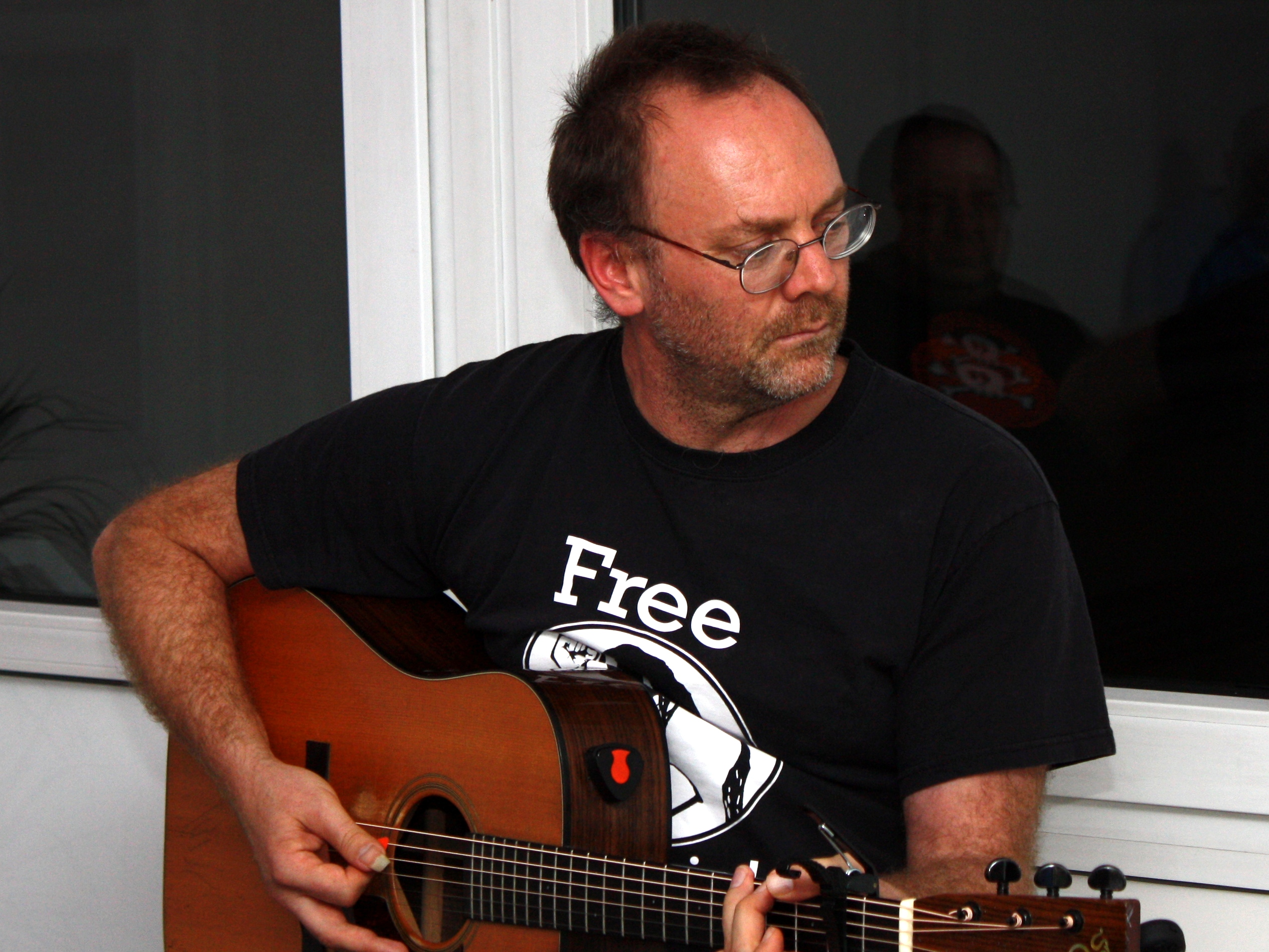
- Rovics at a performance in Frankfurt, 2013

Background information
- Born: April 10, 1967 (age 59)
- Origin: New York City, U.S.
- Education: Earlham College (no degree)
- Genres: Indie; folk; folk punk; protest music
- Occupation: Singer/songwriter
- Years active: 1992–present
- Website: www.davidrovics.com

David Stefan Rovics (/ˈroʊvɪks/ ROH-viks; born April 10, 1967) is an American indie singer, songwriter, and political activist. Rovics describes himself as a libertarian socialist and has been an outspoken critic of both the Republican and Democratic Party, as well as foreign policy of the United States.

Rovics is critical of the United States government's policies and claims that the "U.S. government's foreign policy represents U.S. corporate interests" and that "the U.S. government does not like democracy either at home or abroad."

Although some of Rovics' work is not self-published, and much of it is commercially distributed, Rovics has made all of his recorded music freely available as downloadable mp3 files. He encourages non-profit, free distribution of his work by to spread political messages, and speaks out against websites that charge for downloading his songs. Rovics has also advocated the performing of his songs at protests and demonstrations and has made his sheet music and lyrics available for download.

== Biography ==
David Rovics was born in New York City to a Jewish family. His family moved to Wilton, Connecticut, when he was young. Rovics was politically inspired during his adolescence by his experiences with the conservative-oriented, Christian milieu of his home town. His parents, both classical musicians and educators, were liberal in their outlook. Perhaps for this reason, while in his teens Rovics acquired interests in nuclear disarmament, vegetarianism and other counterculture issues. He has described himself as an anti-Zionist ethnic Jew who doesn't practice Judaism.

In 1985, Rovics enrolled at Earlham College in Richmond, Indiana, but dropped out and moved to Berkeley, California. He worked in occupations such as a cook, barista, secretary and typist, while pursuing his musical interests as a street and subway performer and in small clubs and bars. He immersed himself in leftist counterculture and made contact with other songwriters and performers on the underground circuit. By the early 1990s he was a full-time busker in the Boston subways.

From the mid-1990s, Rovics has spent most of his time on concert tours around the world. Rovics tours regularly on four continents, playing for audiences large and small at cafes, pubs, universities, churches, union halls and protest rallies. He has had his music featured on Democracy Now!, the BBC, Al-Jazeera, Acik Radyo and other networks. His essays are published regularly on CounterPunch and Truthout and the 200+ songs he makes available on the web have been downloaded more than a million times. Although Rovics' work has not gained major commercial success, it has been acclaimed in sections of the press.

== Personal life ==
He currently lives in Portland, Oregon, with his family and has a daughter, Leila, who was born in 2006.

== Political activism ==
Interview with David Rovics on Talk Nation Radio dealing with the politics of music.

Rovics has also written a song on Francis Hughes, a Provisional IRA combatant who died in the 1981 Irish Hunger Strike, in his song "Up The Provos".

In 2021, Rovics interviewed white nationalist activist Matthew Heimbach and posted it on his YouTube account, and hosted a conversation with Israeli musician Gilad Atzmon on the same account, as well as appearing on the podcast of conspiracy theorist Kevin Barrett. As a result, Rovics has been accused by anti-fascist activists It's Going Down and Shane Burley of promoting individuals associated with white nationalism, antisemitism and Holocaust denial. Rovics temporarily removed the interview with Heimbach from his site, but responded that Atzmon is not an antisemite and Heimbach not a fascist, and that it is important to understand why people are drawn to the far-right.

== Discography ==
- Make It So (Self-release, 1996)
- Pay Day at Coal Creek (Self-release, 1998)
- We Just Want the World (Liberation Records, 1999)
- Live at Club Passim (Liberation Records, 2000)
- Living In These Times (Liberation Records, 2001)
- Hang a Flag In the Window (Liberation Records, 2002)
- Who Would Jesus Bomb? (Self-release, 2003)
- Behind the Barricades, the Best of David Rovics (AK Press/Daemon Records 2003)
- The Return (Ever Reviled Records, 2003)
- Songs for Mahmud (Ever Reviled Records, 2004)
- Beyond the Mall (Self-release, 2004)
- For the Moment (Yoyo Records, 2005)
- Halliburton Boardroom Massacre (MI5 Records/Caroline Distribution, 2006)
- The Commons (Irregular Records, 2007) Recorded live at Club Passim
- Ten Thousand Miles Away (Liberation Records, 2009)
- Waiting for the Fall - A Retrospective (Liberation Records, 2009)
- Troubador: People's History in Song (Liberation Records, 2010)
- Big Red Sessions (Liberation Records, 2011)
- Ten New Songs (2011) (Liberation Records, 2011)
- Meanwhile In Afghanistan (Liberation Records, 2012)
- 99% (Liberation Records, 2012)
- Spies Are Reading My Blog (Liberation Records, 2013)
- A Coup That Wasn't A Coup (Aug 17, 2013)
- Everything Can Change (Liberation Records, 2013)
- Into A Prism (Liberation Records, 2013)
- Falasteen Habibti (Self-release, 2014)
- All the News That's Fit to Sing (Self-release, 2014)
- When I'm Elected President / Wayfaring Stranger (Self-release, 2014)
- The Other Side (Self-release, 2015)
- 1936 (Self-Release, 2016)
- Letter to My Landlord (Self-Release, 2016)
- Spies are Reading My Blog (Self-Release, 2017)
- Punk Baroque (Self-Release, 2017)
- Ballad of a Wobbly (Self-Release, 2018)
- Historic Times (Self-Release, 2019)
- Meanwhile in Afghanistan (Self-Release, 2019)
- Songs for Today (Self-Release, 2019)
- Strangers and Friends (Self-Release, 2019)
- Notes From a Failed State (Self-Release, 2020)
- Say Their Names (Self-Release, 2020)
- Rebel Songs (Free The Imagination) (Self-Release, 2020)
- It's Been a Year (Self-Release, 2021)
- May Day (Self-Release, 2021)
- Killing the Messenger (Self-Release, 2023)
- Notes From A Holocaust (Self-Release, 2023)
- Bearing Witness (Self-Release, 2024)
- I Heard A Rumor (Self-Release, 2024)
- Jabaliya (Self-Release, 2024)
- From the Ashes (Self-Release, 2025)
- Make the Planet Earth Great Again (Self-Release, 2025)
- Deport the Billionaires (Self-Release, 2025)
- In Our Dreams (Self-Release, 2025)

=== Children's albums ===
- Har Har Har! Pirate Songs for Kids (CD Baby.Com/Indys, 2008)
- Ballad of a Dung Beetle (2011)

== See also ==
- Anti-Rent War, the subject of Rovics' song Landlord
