= Laurence McKeown =

Irish writer and republican

- Born: September 1956 (age 70); Randalstown, County Antrim, Northern Ireland
- Education: Open University (BSS); Queen's University Belfast (DSocSci)
- Occupations: Writer, Academic, Playwright
- Known for: 1981 Irish Hunger Strike, Belfast Film Festival
- Notable work: Nor Meekly Serve My Time: The H-Block Struggle 1976–1981; Out Of Time: Irish Republican Prisoners; Long Kesh, 1972–2000
- Military career
- Paramilitary: Provisional IRA
- Service years: c. 1972 – 1992
- Conflicts: The Troubles

Laurence McKeown (born 1956) is an Irish author, playwright, screenwriter, and former volunteer in the Provisional Irish Republican Army (IRA) who took part in the 1981 Irish hunger strike.

== Background and IRA activity ==
McKeown was born in 1956 in Randalstown, County Antrim, Northern Ireland. He attended St Malachy's College, Belfast. As a teenager, McKeown had ambitions of becoming an architect and started working in the offices of a quantity surveyor when aged 15. When aged 16 he joined the IRA. He said of joining the IRA: "There was a lot of soul-searching. It's not like joining a state army, where someone signs their name, gets a uniform and rifle, and the chaplain blesses them." In August 1976, McKeown was arrested and charged with causing a series of bomb explosions and the attempted murder of a member of the Royal Ulster Constabulary. At his trial in April 1977, McKeown was found guilty and sentenced to life imprisonment in the Maze Prison. McKeown refused to recognise the courts.

== Imprisonment and hunger strike ==
McKeown took part in the blanket protest at the Maze Prison upon arrival in 1977 with the aim of resecuring Special Category Status for convicted paramilitary prisoners, which had been lost in 1975. He then joined the subsequent no-wash protest in 1978. In late 1980 the protest escalated and seven prisoners took part in a hunger strike, aimed at restoring political status by securing what were known as the "Five Demands":

1. The right not to wear a prison uniform;
2. The right not to do prison work;
3. The right of free association with other prisoners, and to organise educational and recreational pursuits;
4. The right to one visit, one letter and one parcel per week;
5. Full restoration of remission lost through the protest.

The strike ended before any prisoners had died and without political status being secured, and a second hunger strike began on 1 March 1981 led by Bobby Sands, the IRA's former Officer Commanding in the prison. McKeown joined the strike on 29 June, after Sands and three other prisoners had died. Following the deaths of six other prisoners, McKeown's family authorised medical intervention to save his life on 6 September, the 70th day of his hunger strike. He described his recollection of the events in an interview:

"We were committed to something. Unless someone was coming in and saying “Right, you have your own clothes, you won’t do prison work, you have all your demands,” short of that we wouldn’t have entertained it. It was all or nothing at that stage. The fact that so many people had died made us even more determined."

"You're very sleepy and very, very tired and you're sort of nodding off to sleep but something's telling you to keep waking up. This was the thing that kept everybody going through the hunger strike in trying to live or last out as long as possible. I knew death was close but I wasn't afraid to die – and it wasn't any sort of courageous or glorious thing. I think death would have been a release. You can never feel that way again. It's not like tiredness. It's an absolute, total, mental and physical exhaustion. It's literally like slipping into death."

== Freedom ==
McKeown was released in 1992. Before his release, he completed a bachelor's degree in social science from the Open University while in prison, and subsequently obtained a PhD in Sociology from Queen's University Belfast. In the mid-1990s he co-founded the Belfast Film Festival, and has written two books about Irish republican prisoners in the Maze Prison; Nor Meekly Serve My Time: The H-Block Struggle 1976–1981 (co-written with Brian Campbell and Felim O'Hagan) was published in 1994, and Out Of Time: Irish Republican Prisoners, Long Kesh, 1972–2000 was published in 2001. In 1996 he was an unsuccessful candidate in the Northern Ireland Forum election in South Antrim. In 2006 he appeared in a two-part documentary titled Hunger Strike, which was shown on RTÉ to mark the 25th anniversary of the 1981 hunger strike. McKeown also works as a Development Officer for Coiste na nIarchimí, an umbrella organisation of republican ex-prisoners groups.

== Writing ==
McKeown and Brian Campbell co-wrote a film about the 1981 hunger strike called H3 which was directed by Les Blair, and premiered in cinemas on 28 September 2001. Before the death of Campbell in 2005, he and McKeown also wrote two plays together, The Laughter of Our Children which debuted in 2001, and A Cold House which debuted in 2003. McKeown's first solo play, The Official Version, debuted on 18 September 2006. He has continued to write drama, including Two Roads West which is a site-specific play set in a Belfast black cab, where the audience enters the cab with the two actors. The play was revived with an altered script for a Derry location as part of Derry City of Culture in 2013.

In 2016, McKeown's play Green and Blue premiered at the Girdwood Community Hub, Belfast as part of the Belfast International Festival. Produced by Kabosh, Green and Blue dramatises the realities faced by, and unlikely relationship between, a Garda officer and an RUC officer. It was inspired by the Voices From the Vault oral history project which recorded first-hand accounts of Garda Síochána and Royal Ulster Constabulary experiences during the Troubles.

=== Selected Playography ===
- The Laughter of Our Children (2001, co-written with Brian Campbell)
- A Cold House (2003, co-written with Brian Campbell)
- Two Roads West (2009)
- The Official Version (2006)
- The West Awakes (2010)
- Those You Pass On The Street (2014)
- Green and Blue (2016)
- Something In The Air (2019)
- Before You Go (2021)

== Publications ==
- Nor Meekly Serve My Time: The H-Block Struggle 1976–1981 (1994, co-written with Brian Campbell and Felim O'Hagan) ISBN 978-0-9514229-5-3.
- Out Of Time: Irish Republican Prisoners, Long Kesh, 1972–2000 (2001) ISBN 978-1-900960-10-6.
- Threads (2019) ISBN 978-1-912561-23-0
- Time Shadows : A Prison Memoir (2021) ISBN 978-1-914318-11-5
- And Flowers Grew Up Through the Concrete: a prison memoir 1981-1992 (2025) ISBN 978-1-914318-32-0
