= Joe Nina =

South African singer (born 1974)

- Birth name: Makhosini Henry Xaba
- Born: 12 June 1974 (age 51)
- Origin: South Africa
- Genres: Pop
- Occupation: Singer

Makhosini Henry Xaba (born 12 June 1974), better known by stage name Joe Nina, is a popular South African singer. In 1997 he wrote the theme song for, and joined the cast, of Les Blair's Channel Four Films improv comedy film Jump the Gun.

== Early life ==
Xaba was born in Kwa-Thema in the East Rand township, Gauteng province of South Africa.

== Discography ==
His first albums in the early 1990s under the aliases T McCool and King Rap, before switching to Joe Nina:

- One Time One Vibe - first album as Joe Nina
- Ding Dong (1994) - featuring hit single "Ding Dong"
- Joy - Kuya Sheshwa La (1996) - featuring hit single "Joy"
- Egogogweni (1998)
- Sbali (1999)
- Mbabasa (2000)
- Nomthandazo (2001)
- Moments (2005) - featuring hit "Ebunzimeni"
- Unchained (2009)
- Back Together 4 Life (2014)'
- Ding Dong — The Greatest Hits At 40

=== Singles ===
Hit singles include:

- "Ding Dong"
- "Precisely"
- "S'Bali"
- "Zodwa"
- "Pascalina"
- "Maria Podesta"
- "Phuma Kimi".
