= Baby Cele =

South African actress

Baby Cele - Maloka
- Born: Baby Cele; 22 March 1972 (age 54); Umlazi, KwaZulu-Natal, South Africa
- Occupation: Actress
- Years active: 1986–present
- Notable work: Backstage; Sarafina!; Uzalo
- Spouse: Thabo Maloka (m. 2017)
- Children: 2 Including Yolisa Cele & Sandiso Vusumuzi Thwala (Adopted)

Baby Cele-Maloka (born 22 March 1972) is a South African actress born in Umlazi, KwaZulu-Natal.

== Career ==
Cele gained recognition for her role as Kaltego Rathebe, a character she portrayed for eight years on the now defunct e.tv youth television soap opera Backstage. She went on to play the role of Portia in the SABC 1 sitcom My Perfect Family.

In 2011, she portrayed the role of Beauty in the mini-series Shreds & Dreams, based on the 2004 play by Clare Stopford.

From 2012 to 2013, she portrayed the character of Slindile Dludlu in the Mzansi Magic telenovela Inkaba. Cele also starred as Gasta Cele in the soap opera Zabalaza. In 2016, she portrayed the character of Sibongile Nene on Isidingo.

She was also a cast member of the stage musical Sarafina!. Cele also performed in the stage play Cards.

In 2018, she joined the cast of the telenovela Uzalo, where she portrays the character of Gabisile Mdletshe.

== Personal life ==
Cele is married to businessman Thabo Maloka. She also has a calling gift from her ancestors which made her leave her acting job. She has an adopted child named Sandiso Vusumuzi Thwala. Sandiso is UDlakadla Omkhulu on Facebook. She is a mother of two children.

== Awards and nominations ==
Year	Award Ceremony	Category	Nominated work	Result	Ref.
1996	Vita Awards	Best Performance by an Actress in a Leading Role	The Game	Won	
1996	Africa Movie Academy Awards	All Africa Film Award for Most Promising Newcomer	Jump the Gun	Won	
2006	SAFTA	Golden Horn Award for Best Supporting Actress in a TV Soap	Backstage	Nominated	
2013	SAFTA	Golden Horn Award for Best Actress in a TV Comedy	My Perfect Family	Nominated	
2014	SAFTA	Golden Horn Award for Best Actress in a TV Comedy	My Perfect Family	Nominated	
2020	SAFTA	Golden Horn Award for Best Actress	Uzalo	Pending	
