= Jump the Gun (film) =

1997 South African film

- Directed by: Les Blair
- Written by: Les Blair
- Produced by: Indra de Lanerolle
- Starring: Baby Cele; Lionel Newton; Michele Burgers; Thulani Nyembe; Rapulana Seiphemo; Danny Keogh
- Cinematography: Seamus McGarvey
- Edited by: Oral Norrie Ottey
- Music by: Joe Nina
- Production company: Channel Four Films
- Release date: May 23, 1997
- Running time: 124
- Countries: South Africa; United Kingdom
- Language: English

Jump the Gun is a 1997 South African film directed by Les Blair for Channel Four Films. The film follows six diverse, working-class individuals as they try and establish themselves in the newly democratic South Africa. Les Blair's quintessentially British kitchen sink realism is applied to a South African context. The film stars Baby Cele, Lionel Newton, and Michele Burgers amongst others. Characters were built from the ground up with South African actors by using improvisation.

The film was nominated at the 1997 Chicago International Film Festival for a Gold Hugo award for best film.

== Plot summary ==
Set in Johannesburg, South Africa, the film follows the tangled lives of six very different working-class characters, formerly kept apart by apartheid. United by their common insecurities, the film follows their struggle to discover their niche in this brave new world where opportunity beckons, but violence is always lurking.

== Cast ==
- Baby Cele as Gugu, an ambitious singer looking to make it in the big city. She befriends Thabo and Bazooka to jumpstart her career.
- Lionel Newton as Clinton van Rooyen, a frequently drunk misfit who doesn't quite fit in the recently diversified South Africa. He starts a relationship with Minnie.
- Michele Burgers as Minnie, a hooker who picks up clients at the bar Clinton frequents. She falls for him.
- Thulani Nyembe as Bazooka, the film's villain who attempts to dominate Gugu and corrupt Thabo.
- Rapulana Seiphemo as Thabo, an earnest band manager who tries to give Gugu a shot at stardom.
- Danny Keogh as J.J., the owner of the bar.
- Marcel van Heerden as Johnny Fouché.
- Nomsa Nene as Sis Buleng.
- Grace Mahlamba as Puti.
- Joe Nina as Henry.
- John Simon Jones as Gun shop owner.
- Sam Mofokeng as Oupa.
- Fana Mokoena as Man in shacks.
- Michael Ketoa as Boy in gun shop.
- Themba Ndaba as Jewellery shop robber.
- Patrick Ndlovu as Sello.
- Francois Stemmet as Party Host.
