= Richard O'Rawe =

Former Provisional IRA prisoner and author

- Born: 1953 (age 72–73) Belfast, Northern Ireland
- Occupation: Author
- Period: 2005–present
- Genre: Memoir, biography, crime fiction
- Subject: The Troubles, 1981 Irish hunger strike, Irish republicanism
- Years active: 2005–present
- Notable works: Blanketmen (2005); In the Name of the Son (2013); Northern Heist (2018); Stakeknife's Dirty War

Richard O'Rawe (born 1953) is an Irish author and former Irish republican activist from Belfast, best known for his 2005 memoir Blanketmen: An Untold Story of the H-Block Hunger Strike, in which he claimed that the Provisional Irish Republican Army leadership rejected a British settlement offer that could have ended the 1981 Irish hunger strike before six further prisoners died. A former Provisional IRA volunteer, O'Rawe served as press officer for the prisoners in Long Kesh during the hunger strikes and was among the original blanket men. His allegations, which implicated Gerry Adams and other senior republicans in a decision shaped by electoral calculation rather than the welfare of the hunger strikers, provoked lasting controversy within the republican movement. He has since written a biography of Gerry Conlon of the Guildford Four, a study of British agent Freddie Scappaticci, and a debut novel, Northern Heist (2018), loosely based on the Northern Bank robbery of 2004.

== Early life ==
Richard O'Rawe was born in 1953 and spent the first fourteen years of his life in the Lower Falls district of Belfast. His home was at the corner of Peel Street and Mary Street. Nearby lived Gerry Conlon. In 1970, his home in Peel Street was demolished as part of the redevelopment of the area and he and his family moved to Ballymurphy, a new housing estate. At this time, The Troubles was developing. In 1971, the Ballymurphy massacre occurred in which eleven civilians were killed by the British Army. The following year, there was the Battle at Springmartin nearby. As a result of the heightened conflict in the area, O'Rawe became involved in Irish republican politics.

O'Rawe has said that his father was a committed IRA man during the 1940s and was interned without trial during the IRA campaign of the 1950s. He joined the IRA at the age of seventeen. He was interned twice in the early 1970s. In 1977, he was arrested for robbing the Northern Bank in Mallusk, County Antrim, an authorised IRA operation. He was later also imprisoned in Crumlin Road Gaol and then in Long Kesh prison.

== Role in the hunger strikes ==
In Long Kesh prison in 1981, O'Rawe served as the Provisional IRA press officer for the prisoners, effectively second-in-command within the prison during the 1981 Irish hunger strike. He drafted the statement announcing the start of the hunger strike on 1 March 1981. The IRA's officer commanding (OC) in the H-Blocks at the time was Bik McFarlane. O'Rawe subsequently claimed that terms for ending the hunger strikes, accepted by the prisoners' leadership inside the prison, were rejected by IRA commanders outside. He alleged that a secret British offer, communicated through a go-between known as "the Mountain Climber", was accepted by himself and McFarlane but overruled by the Army Council, on the advice of Gerry Adams. O'Rawe has claimed that the IRA rejected the deal because the Irish republican candidate Owen Carron would have a better chance of winning the Fermanagh and South Tyrone by-election if the hunger strike was ongoing on polling day, thereby launching Sinn Féin into electoral politics. Six more hunger strikers died after the point at which O'Rawe contends the offer was rejected.

In 1985, O'Rawe was asked, along with two other republicans, to vet all communications to and from the H-Blocks before they were handed to journalist David Beresford, who was writing a book on the hunger strike. He has since stated that he was told to remove all references to the Mountain Climber from those communications, and that the communication in which he and McFarlane had accepted the British offer was already missing.

== Writing career ==
On his release from prison, O'Rawe worked in the Sinn Féin press office on the Falls Road, at the request of Gerry Adams and Tom Hartley. In 1984, he was involved in coordinating the publicity campaign against the supergrass system. He left the republican movement in 1985 for family reasons and subsequently had what he has described as a varied business career, running a taxi depot and later a bar. In 2001, O'Rawe gave testimony to the Boston College oral history project, during which, for the first time, he described in detail his account of events during the 1981 hunger strikes. He has said the experience was emotionally overwhelming and led him to publish his account publicly.

=== Blanketmen (2005) ===
O'Rawe's first book, Blanketmen: An Untold Story of the H-Block Hunger Strike, was published in February 2005 by New Island. The book set out his account of events during the 1981 hunger strikes, including his claim that the IRA leadership had rejected a viable British offer and that six men had consequently died unnecessarily. The book was not submitted to the republican movement for approval before publication, which O'Rawe said in part explained the hostility directed at him by some republicans following its release.

The book provoked significant controversy. Danny Morrison said O'Rawe should "hang his head in shame" and strenuously denied that the IRA leadership had rejected a viable British offer. Bik McFarlane described the account as "scurrilous, wrong and absolutely inaccurate", stating that there had been "no outside intervention to prevent a deal". The families of the hunger strikers were divided in their response. Some republicans, including former friends and comrades of O'Rawe, ceased contact with him after publication. Hugh Logue of the Irish Commission for Justice and Peace, who had been involved in attempts to broker an end to the hunger strike, described the book as raising "many important questions" that deserved answers. He noted that the terms O'Rawe described as being on offer were similar to those the Commission had itself negotiated with the Northern Ireland Office. The book was serialised in The Sunday Times. O'Rawe rejected suggestions that he had written the book to serve an anti-Adams agenda, stating that the book was completed months before any discussions with the newspaper took place.

=== In the Name of the Son (2013) ===
O'Rawe subsequently wrote a biography of Gerry Conlon, the Guildford Four member who had grown up near him in Belfast and who had served fifteen years in prison for an IRA attack he did not commit. O'Rawe has described the process of writing the book as emotionally demanding, involving extensive interviews with figures including Shane MacGowan and Paddy Joe Hill of the Birmingham Six.

=== Northern Heist (2018) ===
Northern Heist, O'Rawe's debut novel, was published by Merrion Press in 2018. The book was loosely inspired by the 2004 Northern Bank robbery in Belfast, in which £26.5 million was taken, and by a series of tiger kidnappings carried out in Belfast in the early 2000s. The fictional narrative centres on a former IRA man, James "Ructions" O'Hare, who assembles a team to rob a Belfast bank and subsequently comes under pressure from former republican associates seeking a share of the proceeds. O'Rawe worked on the novel over a period of approximately eight years, rewriting large sections after completing his Gerry Conlon biography. He has said he wanted the book to convey the trauma inflicted on families subjected to tiger kidnappings, even in cases where no physical violence occurs.

=== Stakeknife's Dirty War (2023) ===
O'Rawe subsequently published Stakeknife's Dirty War, an examination of Freddie Scappaticci, a senior IRA figure who was revealed in 2003 to have been a long-serving British intelligence agent operating within the IRA's internal security unit, known as the Nutting Squad. O'Rawe had known Scappaticci from his time in Long Kesh in 1973, describing him as a nodding acquaintance whom he had regarded as a serious IRA man.

== Political views ==
O'Rawe has described himself as a self-styled "independent republican" who cut ties with Sinn Féin in 1985. He has said that the armed struggle "didn't work" and that it is "difficult to disagree" with the position taken by John Hume and Seamus Mallon at the time. In 2021, he accepted an invitation to sit on the experts and reference panel of the SDLP's New Ireland Commission.

== Publications ==
- 2005: Blanketmen: An Untold Story of the H-block Hunger Strike. New Island Books
- 2011: Afterlives: The Hunger Strike and the Secret Offer that Changed Irish History. Lilliput Press.
- 2017: In the Name of the Son: The Gerry Conlon Story. Merrion Press.
- 2018: Northern Heist. Merrion Press
- 2022: Goering's Gold: A Ructions O'Hare Novel. Melville House.
- 2023: Stakeknife's Dirty War: The Inside Story of Scappaticci, the IRA's Nutting Squad and the British Spooks Who Ran the War. Merrion Press.
