= H3 (film) =

2001 film by Les Blair

- Directed by: Les Blair
- Written by: Brian Campbell; Laurence McKeown
- Produced by: James Flynn
- Starring: Brendan Mackey; Mark O'Halloran
- Cinematography: Owen McPolin
- Edited by: Niamh Fagan
- Music by: Ray Harman
- Distributed by: Metropolitan Films
- Release date: 15 July 2001
- Running time: 88 minutes
- Country: Ireland
- Languages: English; Irish

H3 is a film released in 2001 about the 1981 Irish hunger strike at HM Prison Maze in Northern Ireland, the events leading up to it, and subsequent developments in the prisoners' struggle for Prisoner of War status. It was directed by Les Blair and was written by Brian Campbell and Laurence McKeown; McKeown was a former volunteer in the Provisional IRA who participated in the hunger strike.

== Cast ==
- Brendan Mackey as Seamus Scullion
- Dean Lennox Kelly as Ciaran
- Aidan Campbell as Declan
- Tony Devlin as Madra
- Kevin Elliot as Liam
- Mark O'Halloran as Bobby Sands
- Sean McDonagh as Proinsias
- Fergal McElherron as Francis Hughes
- Mark McCrory as Morton
- Dan Gordon as Simpson
- Gerry O'Brien as The Governor

== Awards ==
The film was nominated for four awards and won one of them, the Golden Rosa Camuna award at the Bergamo Film Meeting.
