= Thomas McElwee =

Provisional IRA member

- Born: 30 November 1957; Bellaghy, County Londonderry, Northern Ireland
- Died: 8 August 1981 (aged 23)
- Cause of death: Hunger strike
- Organisation: Provisional IRA
- Known for: firebombing a shop, hunger strike of 62 days from 8 June 1981
- Criminal charges: manslaughter, possession of explosives
- Criminal penalty: 20 years

Thomas McElwee (30 November 1957 – 8 August 1981) was a Provisional Irish Republican Army (IRA) volunteer who participated in the 1981 hunger strike. From Bellaghy, County Londonderry, Northern Ireland, he died at the age of 23 after 62 days on hunger strike.

== Paramilitary activity ==
Thomas McElwee and his cousin Francis Hughes formed an independent Republican unit, which for several years carried out ambushes on British Army patrols as well carrying out bomb attacks in neighbouring towns such as Magherafelt, Castledawson, and Maghera.

In October 1976, McElwee took part in a planned bombing blitz on the town of Ballymena. Along with several colleagues, he was transporting one of the bombs, which exploded prematurely and blinded him in his right eye. Following his arrest, he was charged and sentenced to 20 years' imprisonment for possession of explosives and the manslaughter of Yvonne Dunlop, who was killed when one of the firebombs destroyed the shop she was working in.

In prison he became involved in the blanket protest. He joined the 1981 Irish hunger strike and died on 8 August 1981 at the age of 23, after 62 days on the strike.

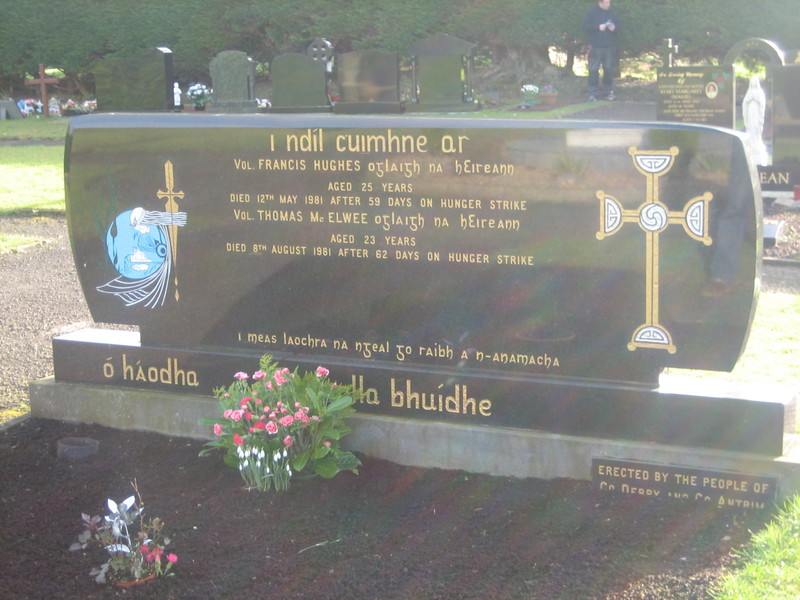
Gravestone of Thomas McElwee and Francis Hughes.

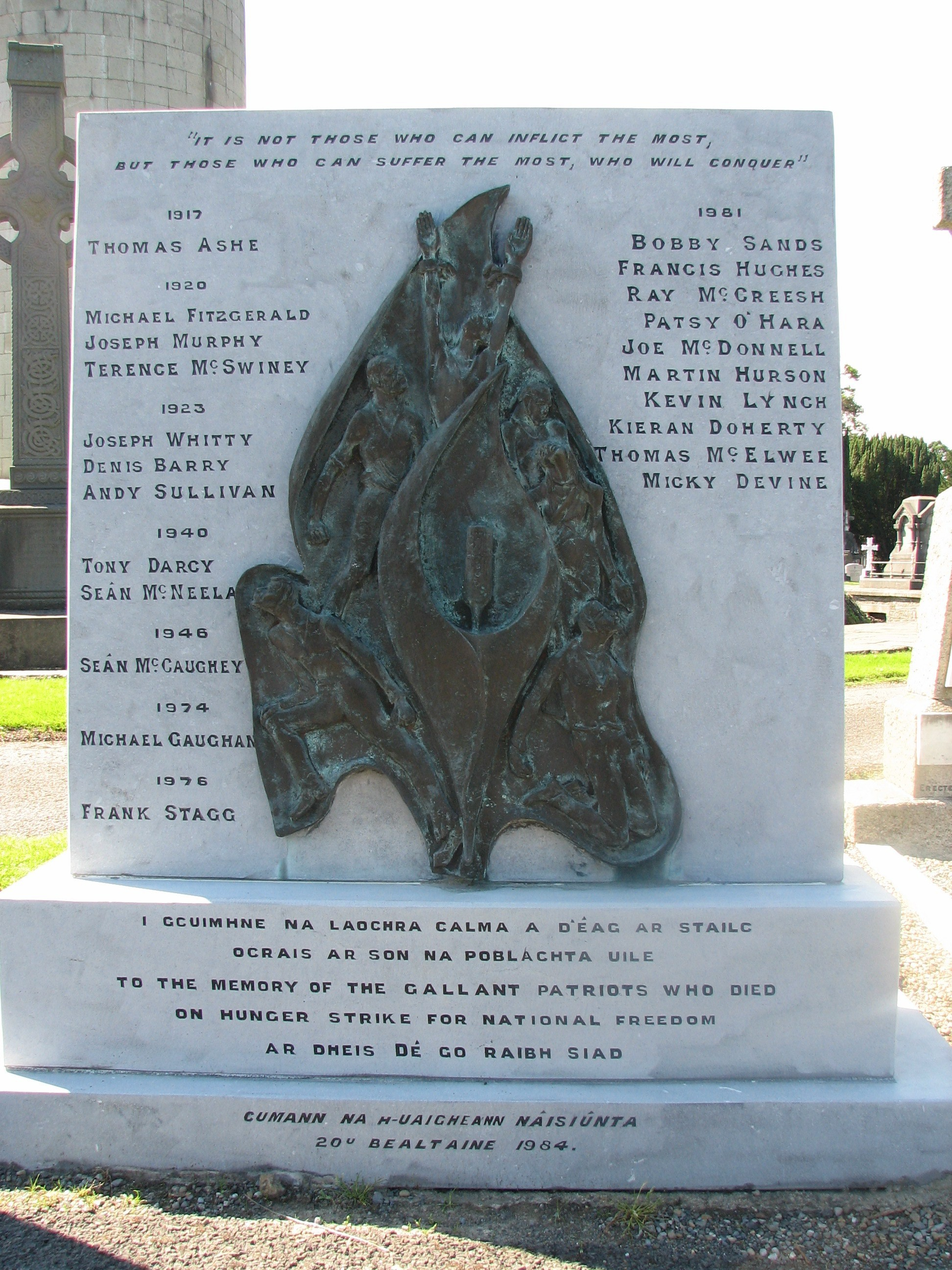
Hunger Strikers Memorial Glasnevin Cemetery Dublin

== Aftermath ==
In 2009, Republican Sinn Féin (RSF) named their Waterford cumann after him replacing that of George Lennon, O/C of the Waterford Flying Column who led the IRA anti-Treaty Republicans into Waterford City in March 1922. The Waterford RSF had adopted the Lennon name without the permission of his son who noted that his father had, in later years, become a committed pacifist and opponent of the war in Vietnam. McElwee is the main subject of the song Farewell to Bellaghy, which also mentions his cousin Francis Hughes, other members of the independent Republican unit and deceased volunteers of the South Derry Brigade of the Provisional IRA. He is also the subject of the Crucifucks' song The Story of Thomas McElwee.
