= It's Going Down (website) =

Media collective

- Formation: 2015; 11 years ago
- Type: Media collective
- Website: itsgoingdown.org

It's Going Down (IGD) is a media collective publishing news, analysis, and commentary from an anarchist perspective. The collective covers autonomous anti-capitalist, anti-colonial, and anti-fascist movements across North America. It is known for producing investigative work on far-right, white nationalist, and neo-Nazi networks, as well as reports on contemporary social struggles and movements.

== Content ==
The website launched in 2015 and publishes content on their website, along with a podcast and radio show. The website experienced a major spike in readership following Donald Trump's presidential election in 2016.

== History ==
In June 2017, Jesse Watters interviewed an individual who claimed to be the leader of "Antifa". The segment started with Watters reading from "An Open Letter To Liberals & Progressives From The Black Bloc," an editorial on the site. Kevin, the interviewee, claimed to have written the article. The interviewee later made clear that the appearance had been a prank and that he had no association with It's Going Down. Donald Trump may have watched the show and Eric Trump shared a clip from it.

In September 2017, Peter Beinart quoted It's Going Down as stating that "[s]uddenly, anarchists and antifa, who have been demonized and sidelined by the wider Left have been hearing from liberals and Leftists, 'you've been right all along.'"

Two women charged and convicted for terrorist attacks and violence against railroad workers published on It's Going Down a letter taking responsibility for the Washington state attacks which could have caused derailments in January 2020. The website stated that it does not take responsibility for content published on it.

In August 2020, Facebook expanded its "Dangerous Individuals and Organizations policy", removing It's Going Down alongside over 800 QAnon, far-right militia, anti-racist and anti-capitalist groups. It's Going Down and Crimethinc., another left-wing and anarchist publishing platform that dates back to the 1990s, released a joint statement against the bans. This announcement followed a Senate Judiciary Subcommittee hearing on "stopping anarchist violence" led by Ted Cruz which mentioned It's Going Down among other media collectives.

On 18 October 2025, an article was published by IGD stating that the website would be going on an indefinite hiatus.

== See also ==
- Anarchism in the United States
