= Begoña Aretxaga =

Spanish anthropologist

- Born: 24 February 1960 (age 66); San Sebastián, Spain
- Died: 28 December 2002 (aged 42); Austin, Texas, U.S.
- Title: Associate Professor of Anthropology

Academic background
- Education: Princeton University
- Thesis: (1992)

Academic work
- Discipline: Anthropology
- Sub-discipline: Political Anthropology
- Main interests: nationalism, gender and sexuality, political violence
- Notable works: Maddening states Shattering Silence: Women, nationalism, and subjectivity in Northern Ireland

Begoña Aretxaga (San Sebastián, Spain, 24 February 1960 — Austin, Texas, 28 December 2002) was a Basque anthropologist known for her work on Northern Ireland and Basque country.

She graduated at Philosophy and Phychology from the University of the Basque Country and got her PhD in anthropology on Irish Nationalism with a gender perspective at Princeton University. She lectured in Princeton, Harvard University, and near the end of her life she taught at the University of Texas at Austin. She received the MacArthur Award in recognition of her work in 2001, one year before her death from lung cancer at age 42.
