= Francis Hughes =

Provisional IRA volunteer and hunger striker

- Born: 28 February 1956; Bellaghy, County Londonderry, Northern Ireland
- Died: 12 May 1981 (aged 25); HM Prison Maze, Northern Ireland
- Relatives: Thomas McElwee (cousin)
- Military career
- Paramilitaries: Official IRA (until 1972); Provisional IRA (1972–1981)
- Units: South Derry Brigade
- Known for: Hunger strike of 59 days, from 15 March 1981
- Conflict: The Troubles

Francis Joseph Sean Hughes (28 February 1956 – 12 May 1981) was a volunteer in the Provisional Irish Republican Army (IRA) from Bellaghy, County Londonderry, Northern Ireland. Hughes was the most wanted man in Northern Ireland until his arrest following a shoot-out with the British Army in which a British soldier was killed. At his trial, he was sentenced to a total of 83 years' imprisonment; he died during the 1981 Irish hunger strike in HM Prison Maze. Hughes was one of 22 Irish republicans who died on hunger-strike between 1917 and 1981.

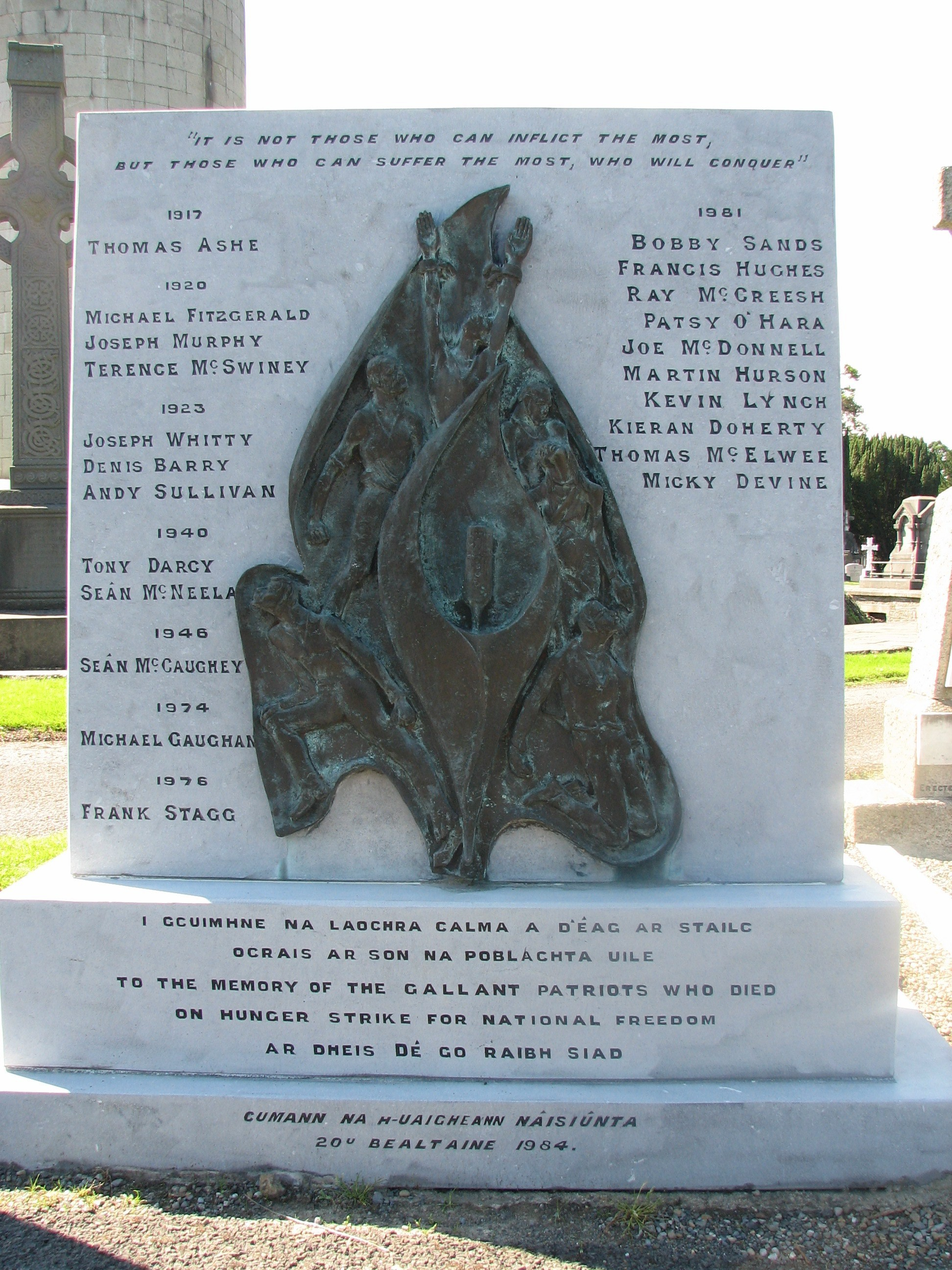
Memorial to 22 Irish Hunger Strikers Deaths Glasnevin Cemetery

== Background ==
Hughes was born in Bellaghy, County Londonderry on 28 February 1956 into a republican family, the youngest of four brothers in a family of ten siblings. Hughes' father, Joseph, had been a member of the Irish Republican Army in the 1920s and one of his uncles had smuggled arms for the republican movement. This resulted in the Hughes family being targeted when internment was introduced in 1971, and Francis Hughes' brother Oliver was interned for eight months without trial in Operation Demetrius. Hughes left school aged 16 and started work as an apprentice painter and decorator.

Hughes was returning from an evening out in Ardboe, County Tyrone when he was stopped at an Ulster Defence Regiment (UDR) checkpoint. When the soldiers realised he came from a republican family, he was badly beaten. Hughes' father encouraged him to see a doctor and report the incident to the police but Hughes refused, saying he "would get his own back on the people who did it, and their friends".

== Paramilitary activity ==
Hughes initially joined the Official Irish Republican Army, but left after the organisation declared a ceasefire in May 1972. Hughes then joined up with Dominic McGlinchey, his cousin Thomas McElwee and Ian Milne, before the three decided to join the Provisional Irish Republican Army's South Derry Brigade in 1973. Hughes, Milne and McGlinchey took part in scores of IRA operations, including daylight attacks on Royal Ulster Constabulary (RUC) stations, bombings, and attacks on off-duty members of the RUC and UDR. Another IRA member described the activities of Hughes:

He led a life perpetually on the move, often moving on foot up to 20 miles during one night then sleeping during the day, either in fields and ditches or safe houses; a soldierly sight in his black beret and combat uniform and openly carrying a rifle, a handgun and several grenades as well as food rations.

On 18 April 1977, Hughes, McGlinchey and Milne were travelling in a car near the town of Moneymore when an RUC patrol car carrying four officers signalled them to stop. The IRA members attempted to escape by performing a u-turn, but lost control of the car which ended up in a ditch. They abandoned the car and opened fire on the RUC patrol car, killing two officers and wounding another, before running off through fields. A second RUC patrol came under fire while attempting to prevent the men fleeing, and despite a search operation by the RUC and British Army (BA) the IRA members escaped. Following the Moneymore shootings, the RUC named Hughes as the most wanted man in Northern Ireland, and issued wanted posters with pictures of Hughes, Milne and McGlinchey. Milne was arrested in Lurgan in August 1977, and McGlinchey later in the year in the Republic of Ireland.

== Arrest and imprisonment ==
Hughes was arrested on 17 March 1978 at Lisnamuck, near Maghera, County Londonderry, after an exchange of gunfire with the British Army the night before. British soldiers manning a covert observation post spotted Hughes and another IRA volunteer approaching them wearing combat clothing with "Ireland" sewn on their jackets. Thinking they might be from the Ulster Defence Regiment, one of the soldiers stood up and called to them. The IRA volunteers opened fire on the British troops, who returned fire. A soldier of the SAS, Lance Corporal David Jones, was killed and another soldier wounded. Hughes was also wounded and was arrested nearby the next morning.

In February 1980, he was sentenced to a total of 83 years in prison. Hughes was tried for, and found guilty of, the murder of one British Army soldier (for which he received a life sentence) and wounding of another (for which he received 14 years) in the incident which led to his arrest, as well as a series of gun and bomb attacks over a six-year period. Security sources described him as "an absolute fanatic" and "a ruthless killer". Fellow republicans described him as "fearless and active".

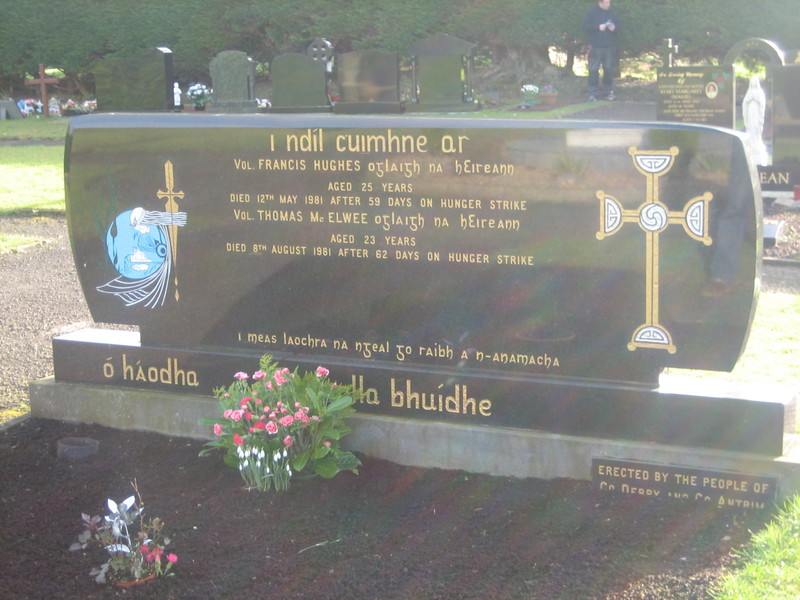
Gravestone erected to Thomas McElwee and Francis Hughes.

== 1981 hunger strike ==
Hughes was involved in the mass hunger strike in 1980, and was the second prisoner to join the 1981 Irish Hunger Strike in the H-Blocks at the Maze prison. His hunger strike began on 15 March 1981, two weeks after Bobby Sands began his hunger strike. He was also the second striker to die, at 5:43pm BST on 12 May, after 59 days without food. His death led to a surge in rioting in nationalist areas of Northern Ireland.

His cousin Thomas McElwee was the ninth hunger striker to die. Oliver Hughes, one of his brothers, was elected twice to Magherafelt District Council.

He is commemorated on the Irish Martyrs Memorial at Waverley Cemetery in Sydney, Australia.

He is portrayed by Fergal McElherron in the film H3.
