= Les Blair =

British television and film director

Leslie "Les" Blair (born 23 October 1941, Manchester, England) is a BAFTA winning television, film and theatre director.

He was educated at Salford Grammar School, where he was a friend of Mike Leigh, later producing Leigh's first feature film, Bleak Moments (1971).

Gaining notoriety for his controversial mini-series Law And Order (shown in 1978 on BBC2), Blair has gone on to direct films characterised by their political and social awareness.

Blair graduated from and currently teaches at London Film School. In 2019, he was made Honorary Associate of London Film School.

== Filmography ==
- Blooming Youth (BBC Play for Today, 1973) (TV)
- Bet Your Life (BBC Play for Today, 1976) (TV)
- Law And Order (1978) (TV)
- Only A Game (1981) (TV)
- Four in a Million (1982) (TV)
- The Nation's Health (1983) (TV)
- Number One (1985)
- Honest Decent And True (1986) (TV)
- London's Burning: The Movie (1986) (TV)
- Leave To Remain (1988) (TV)
- The Accountant (1989)
- News Hounds (1990) (TV)
- Filipina Dreamgirls (1991)
- Tracey Ullman: A Class Act (1992) (TV)
- Bad Behaviour (1993)
- Merrihill Millionaires (1993) (TV)
- Bliss (1995) (TV)
- Jump the Gun (1997)
- Stand And Deliver (1998) (TV)
- H3 (2001)
