= List of hunger strikes =

This is an incomplete list of recent hunger strikes and people who have conducted a hunger strike.

== Hunger strikes ==
- 1923 Irish hunger strikes – thousands of Irish Republican prisoners demand release. Includes info on 1920 Mountjoy and Cork hunger strikes. Six deaths.
- 1980 Irish hunger strike – Protest by Irish republican prisoners from Northern Ireland against the rescindment of Special Category Status during The Troubles
  - Brendan Hughes
  - Tommy McKearney
  - Raymond McCartney
- 1981 Irish hunger strike – ended with 10 of the participants starving themselves to death, radicalizing Irish nationalist politics and leading to Sinn Féin becoming a mainstream political party.
  - Paddy Quinn
  - Francis Hughes
  - Thomas McElwee
- 1983 International Fast For Life (thousands fasted against nuclear armament and world hunger) – Protest against President Ronald Reagan's increased defense spending and the escalation of the Cold War nuclear arms race
- 1986 Veterans Fast For Life – Protest against the Reagan administration's support for the Contra insurgency in Sandinista Nicaragua
- 1989 Kosovo miners' strike – strike of ethnic Albanian Kosovars in the Trepça Mines protesting the abolition of autonomy of the Province of Kosovo by the Socialist Republic of Serbia. 180 hospitalized, resignation of Rahman Morina, Ali Shukriu and Husamedin Azemi; three leaders of League of Communists of Kosovo who were installed by demonstrations supporting the Serbian leader Slobodan Milošević.
- 2000 Death fast in Turkey – Protest by inmates of Turkish F-Type Prisons
- Guantánamo Bay hunger strikes – Prisoner protests at Guantanamo Bay detention camp, a notorious U.S. military prison known for indefinite detention without trial and torture, during the war on terror
  - Ahmed Zaid Salim Zuhair
- 2009 Tamil diaspora protests – Worldwide protest against the Sri Lankan Civil War
- 2009 Venezuelan student hunger strike – Nationwide hunger strike by students asking a visit to Venezuela by the Inter-American Commission on Human Rights
- 2012 Palestinian mass hunger strikes – Protest by Palestinian prisoners against Israeli administrative detention
  - Khader Adnan
- 2012 Kurdish prisoners hunger strike – Part of Peace and Democracy Party demonstrations against Turkish restrictions on Kurdish civil rights during the Kurdish–Turkish conflict and the Arab Spring
- 2013 California prisoner hunger strike – Protest against indefinite solitary confinement at Pelican Bay State Prison and for better conditions at High Desert State Prison.
- 2021 On 8 January, at 63 years of age, Dimitris Koufontinas, imprisoned member of 17N in Greece, entered a hunger strike with the demand of transfer to Korydallos Prison after being sent to a high security prison in Domokos. On 22 February whilst in intensive care at Lamia Hospital Koufontinas started to reject water and medical care, forcibly removing a catheter from his arm before the courts issued an order to force feed the prisoner a few days later, a practice condemned by many, including a Greek union of doctors, as torture. It was reported that on 5 March, Koufontinas had to be resuscitated due to kidney failure. Koufontinas ended his hunger strike on 14 March after 65 days, despite his demands not being met.
- 2021 New York City Taxi Workers' Alliance – protesting the debt incurred from Taxi medallions. Lasted 15 days and was joined by then New York State Representative and future Mayor of New York City Zohran Mamdani, who participated in the last 12 days of the strike
- 2024 Starve until you are honest – a climate hunger strike in Berlin, Germany involving six strikers
- 2025 Prisoners for Palestine hunger strike – eight hunger strikers in UK prisons
- 2026 Aristotelis Hantzis & Suzon Doppagne - Defending the Community Of Squatted Prosfygika of Alexandras avenue in Athens
- 2026 Delaney Hall hunger strike - Around 300 immigrants in a detained in a private prison facility held a 30 day hunger strike to protest facility conditions in Newark, New Jersey

== Groups who have conducted hunger strikes ==
- British and American suffragettes
  - Alice Paul
  - Emmeline Pankhurst
  - Marion Wallace Dunlop
- Cuban dissidents
  - Guillermo Fariñas
  - Pedro Luis Boitel
  - Jorge Luis García Pérez
  - Orlando Zapata Tamayo
  - Jesús Joel Díaz Hernández
  - José Daniel Ferrer
  - Darsi Ferrer Ramírez
  - René Gómez Manzano
- Grup Yorum
  - Helin Bölek
  - Ibrahim Gökçek
- Irish republicans all died while on hunger strike.
  - Thomas Ashe (1917)
  - Terence MacSwiney (1920 Cork hunger strike)
  - Michael Fitzgerald (1920 Cork hunger strike)
  - Joe Murphy (1920 Cork hunger strike)
  - Denny Barry (1923 Irish hunger strikes)
  - Andy O'Sullivan (1923 Irish hunger strikes)
  - Joseph Whitty (1923 Irish hunger strikes)
  - Tony D'Arcy (1940)
  - Jack McNeela (1940)
  - Seán McCaughey (1946)
  - Michael Gaughan (1974)
  - Frank Stagg (1976)
  - Michael Devine (1981)
  - Kieran Doherty (1981) - while on hunger strike was elected to the Republic of Irelands Dáil Éireann, representing the Cavan–Monaghan constituency.
  - Francis Hughes (1981)
  - Martin Hurson (1981)
  - Kevin Lynch (1981)
  - Raymond McCreesh (1981)
  - Joe McDonnell (1981)
  - Thomas McElwee (1981)
  - Patsy O'Hara (1981)
  - Bobby Sands (1981) – leader of the hunger strike; elected to the House of Commons during the strike before his death.
- Indian Independence Movement
  - Jatindra Nath Das
  - Batukeshwar Dutt
  - Bhagat Singh
  - Mahatma Gandhi
- Jailed Catalan pro-independence leaders
  - Jordi Sánchez
  - Jordi Turull
  - Joaquim Forn
  - Josep Rull
- Undocumented migrants in Belgium
- Seven activists from UK's Palestine Action protesting their excessive pre-trial detention.
- Community for Creative Nonviolence, founded by J. Edward Guinan
- Zacchaeus Kitchen, headed by J. Edward Guinan

== Individuals who have conducted a hunger strike ==
- Alaa Abdelfattah, Egyptian
- Maher al-Akhras, Palestinian
- Meryem Altun, Turkish prisoner
- Ninoy Aquino, former Senator of the Philippines
- Stanislav Aseyev, Ukrainian writer and journalist, kidnapped by militants from so-called Donetsk People's Republic
- Lorraine Badoy and Jeffrey Celiz, SMNI news anchors, television franchise probe, 2023
- Igor Bancer, Polish Belarusian musician, activist, journalist, worker, and events organiser
- Marwan Barghouti
- Chen Shui Bian, President of the Republic of China
- Franklin Brito, Venezuela, land dispute, 2010, died
- Emil Calmanovici, Communist Romania, political prisoner, 1956, died
- Cesar Chavez, leader of the United Farm Workers union, Arizona, 1968, 1970, 1972
- Chee Soon Juan, Singaporean opposition politician
- William (Bill) Coleman, 2007 to 2014 in CT, USA
- Alfredo Cospito, Italian anarchist prisoner who started a hunger strike on 20 October 2022 against the 41-bis prison regime
- Jatindra Nath Das, Indian independence activist and revolutionary
- Andrey Derevyankin
- Katherine Dunham
- Ronald Easterbrook, England, prisoner, 1997, 1999
- Becky Edelsohn
- Mahatma Gandhi, Indian independence activist, part of campaign of nonviolent resistance to British rule in India
- Akbar Ganji
- Bekele Gerba, Oromo politician promoting non-violence, 2021
- Andrias Ghukasyan
- Max Goldstein
- J. Edward Guinan, who inspired Mitch Snyder.
- Lena Hades
- Anna Hazare
- J. B. S. Haldane
- Larry Hebert
- Barry Horne
- Charles Hyder, fasts in 1986-87 for 218 days against arms race, nuclear weapons, and nuclear waste
- Samer Tariq Issawi
- Poopathy Kanapathipillai
- Jack Kevorkian
- Mustafa Kocak, starved himself to death in protest of his sentencing without a fair trial
- Jüri Kukk
- Pavel Kushnir, Russian musician and activist, died 2024
- Jawar Mohammed, Ethiopian politician and activist, 2021
- Kasra Nouri
- Jean Lassalle
- Antonio Ledezma, Venezuelan politician, 2009
- Gloria Lee
- Ly Tong
- Haia Lifşiţ
- Ihar Losik, Belarusian blogger
- Joe Madison, known as "The Black Eagle," radio personality and human and civil rights activist, 2021
- Anatoly Marchenko
- Holger Meins
- Akbar Mohammadi
- Abel Muzorewa, Zimbabwean politician and cleric, 1983
- Tony Nicklinson
- Jock Palfreeman
- Vasudev Balwant Phadke
- Darshan Singh Pheruman
- Kemal Pir
- Olden Polynice, Haitian basketball player who went on a 10-day strike
- Muhammad al-Qiq
- Mahmudur Rahman, Bangladeshi news editor
- Militão Ribeiro
- Randall Robinson
- George Rolph
- Mikheil Saakashvili
- Hoda Saber
- Arash Sadeghi
- Andrei Sakharov
- Kostas Sakkas
- Nigamananda Saraswati, protest against illegal mining in the Ganges River
- Jaume Sastre i Font, Catalan teacher in Mallorca
- Nadiya Savchenko, Ukrainian Ground Forces helicopter pilot, kidnapped and detained in Russian prison, 2015 and 2016
- Oleg Sentsov, Ukrainian filmmaker and writer
- Irom Sharmila
- Bhagat Singh, Indian socialist revolutionary
- Surat Singh Khalsa, Sikh Activist
- Mitch Snyder, homeless advocate inspired by J. Edward Guinan
- Mohamed Soltan, Egyptian opposition activist, 2014
- Theresa Spence
- Potti Sreeramulu, Indian revolutionary, specifically for the Andhra region independence movement
- Thileepan (Rasaiah Parthipan)
- Yulia Tymoshenko
- Judith Todd, political activist regarding Zimbabwe
- Sergey Udaltsov, Russian opposition activist, 2011 and 2014
- Lluís Maria Xirinacs, Catalan politician, writer, and religious leader
- Lin Yi-hsiung, protest against the construction of the Lungmen Nuclear Power Plant in New Taipei City
- Shahrokh Zamani, Iranian Labour Activist, died 2015 in Islamic Republic of Iran's prison
- Govinda K.C., Nepali orthopaedic surgeon and philanthropic activist
- Ebru Timtik, Kurdish-Turkish human rights lawyer, died 2020
- Alexei Navalny, Russian opposition leader and anti-corruption activist, 2021
- Parit Chiwarak and Panusaya Sithijirawattanakul, jailed pro-democratic activists, 2021, demanding justice and scrapping of Lese majeste in Thailand
- Jeanine Áñez, jailed former president of Bolivia, 2022.
- Vojislav Šešelj, Serbian politician
- Tomislav Nikolić, Serbian politician, 2011
- Marinika Tepić, Serbian politician, 2023
- Kim Young-sam, South Korean politician
- Kim Dae-jung, South Korean politician
- Chun Doo-hwan, South Korean politician
- Chun Jung-bae, South Korean politician
- Moon Sung-hyun, South Korean politician
- Woo Sang-ho (politician), South Korea
- Choi Byung-ryeol, South Korean politician
- Moon Jae-in, South Korean politician
- Cho Won-jin, South Korean politician
- Kim Sung-tae, South Korean politician
- Hwang Kyo-ahn, South Korean politician
- Woo Won-shik, South Korean politician
- Lee Jae-myung, South Korean politician
- Prashant Kishor, Indian politician
- Sonam Wangchuk, Indian engineer
- Zohran Mamdani, American politician, 2021, 12 days
