= Palestinian prisoners' hunger strikes =

Between 1969 and 2018, Palestinians in Israeli custody held 28 different hunger strikes.

== Background ==
According to Julie M. Norman of Queen's University Belfast, "approximately 40 percent of Palestinian males have been arrested or detained at some time. Not all those arrested are charged or convicted, but many are detained for several days or weeks at a time and subject to interrogations. Most detainees are either charged in the military court or released. However, others are held without charge or trial in administrative detention for renewable periods of up to 90 days."

== Timeline ==
=== 1969 ===
The first significant hunger strikes by Palestinians in Israeli custody took place in early 1969. One of these was a two-week hunger strike in Ramla Prison in mid-February over complaints of inadequate meals and being forced to address the prison guards as "sir." Another was a week-long hunger strike in Kfar Yona Prison in late February concerning similar complaints.

=== 1970 ===
Two separate Palestinian prisoners' hunger strikes took place in 1970.

The first of the strikes was an 8-day hunger strike by Palestinians detained in the Neve Tirtza Women's Prison, between 28 April and 6 May. The strike came to an end after the Israeli authorities agreed to improve the ventilation in the cells and to allow the International Red Cross and Red Crescent Movement to give sanitary products to the prisoners. After the end of the strike, several of the strikers were placed in solitary confinement for their roles in the strike.

The second of the strikes was a 7-day strike by Palestinians detained in the Ashkelon Prison, between 5 and 12 July. During this hunger strike, the first death from a Palestinian prisoner's hunger strike occurred, with prisoner Abd al-Qader Abu al-Fahm dying after being force-fed.

=== 1976 ===
In mid-December 1976, a significant hunger strike by Palestinians in Israeli custody broke out in the Ashkelon Prison, lasting for 45 days. Among the prisoners' demands were better meals and medical care, a reduction in the use of solitary confinement, and prisoner-of-war status. An International Committee of the Red Cross delegation that visited the prison during the strike found that the prisoners were being provided adequate meals.

Following the end of the strike in late January 1977, the hunger strikers would organise sporadic additional hunger strikes in the following weeks. The Israeli authorities moved to disrupt these additional strikes by dispersing the prisoners in different prisons.

=== 1980 ===
A significant hunger strike by Palestinians in Israeli custody broke out in the Nafha Prison in mid July 1980, lasting for 32 days.

Two prisoners would die during the hunger strike: 28-year-old Rasem Halawah, who had been convicted of a terrorist attack that killed one and injured nine in Gaza, and 30-year-old Ali Jafari.

=== 1984 ===
A significant hunger strike by Palestinians in Israeli custody occurred in Autumn 1984 in the Juneid Prison. The hunger strike also saw a general strike in East Jerusalem, held in solidarity with the prisoners. According to Zena Al Tahhan of Al Jazeera, the strike was "considered a turning point in the history of hunger strikes."

=== 1987 ===
Between 25 March and 13 April, three thousand Palestinians in Israeli custody took part in a hunger strike over prison conditions. Among the prisoners' complaints were overcrowding, lack of sunlight, lack of ventilation, abuse by Israeli prison officials, and the refusal of newly appointed Israel Prison Service head David Maimon to recognise the prisoners' self-organised representative committees. The hunger strike sparked a significant wave of unrest throughout the Occupied Palestinian Territories.

=== 1992 ===
Between 27 September and 11 October 1992, up to 10,000 Palestinians in Israeli custody took part in a hunger strike over prison conditions. Among the prisoners' complaints were excessive lengths of time in solitary confinement, detention in underground cells, not enough rations and medical care, as well as overly limited family visiting rights. The hunger strike was accompanied by a wave of protests across the Occupied Palestinian Territories, during which several hundred protestors were injured by Israeli forces, who used tear gas, rubber bullets, and occasionally live ammunition, to disperse protests. At least two of the protestors were shot and killed after throwing stones at Israeli soldiers. One prisoner died of a heart attack due to his participation in the hunger strike. The hunger strike ended after an agreement was reached with Israeli Minister of Internal Security Moshe Shahal to improve some prison conditions, including increasing the time of family visits from 30 to 45 minutes, allowing prisoners to have radios and televisions inside their cells, ending routine strip searching, and removing asbestos from cell ceilings.

=== 1995 ===
Between 17 June and 6 July 1995, several thousand Palestinians prisoners in Israeli custody took part in a hunger strike demanding the inclusion of the release of Palestinian prisoners in the Oslo Accords negotiations. The hunger strike was accompanied by a number of solidarity demonstrations across the Occupied Palestinian Territories, including a West Bank-wide general strike. The hunger strike ended after Oslo Accords negotiators agreed on a gradual release of Palestinian prisoners under the supervision of the Israeli government.

=== 1997 ===
In October 1997, Itaf Alayan, an activist with the militant group Palestinian Islamic Jihad, was arrested while on her way to a memorial for a slain leader of the movement. She was subsequently held in Neve Tirtza Women's Prison under administrative detention rules without charge, prompting her to launch a hunger strike against her arrest and the practice itself. The hunger strike, which lasted for forty-three days, was the longest individual hunger strike by a Palestinian in Israeli custody at that point, and would hold the record until 2012. Alayan was released from detention in January 1998.

=== 2000 ===
On 1 May 2000, almost 1,000 of the 1,650 Palestinian prisoners being held in Israeli prisons at the time participated in a month-long hunger strike, in protest against "arbitrary treatment by prison officials, substandard prison conditions, prohibitions on family visits, use of solitary confinement, poor medical care, and Israel's refusal to release all the categories of prisoners specified in its agreements with the Palestine Liberation Organization (PLO)." Mass demonstrations in solidarity with the prisoners erupted throughout the areas of Palestinian self-rule in the days following, culminating in a mass protest on 15 May (the anniversary of the Nakba) and ending on 18 May, with 7 Palestinians killed and 1,000 injured. In addition, 60 Israelis were also wounded. The hunger strike was ended on 31 May after Israeli prison authorities promised to review the complaints and ease restrictions on visitations. A report by the Israeli government released in June 2001 on conditions in the Shatta prison noted that the living conditions were "particularly harsh" in the wing where prisoners from the Occupied Palestinian Territories were held, and concluded that the exposed tents and filthy bathrooms in which prisoners were housed and bathed were unfit for human use.

=== 2004 ===
In mid-August 2004, over 3000 Palestinians held in Israeli prisons launched a hunger strike. Among the prisoners' demands were the removal of glass partitions in visitor areas, increased access to telephones, an end to solitary confinement, and an end to strip searches. One Palestinian detained in the Negev interviewed by The New Arab in 2015 described the strike's motivations as "in response to the repressive measures and humiliation practised against Palestinian detainees, like strip searches, at the hands of jailers in order to contain the intifada."

The Israeli government reacted uncompromisingly to the hunger strike, with Minister of Internal Security Tzachi Hanegbi declaring that "As far as I am concerned, these terrorists can go on hunger strike for a day, a week, a month - or until death." In a similarly uncompromising manner, Israeli prison authorities removed prisoner access to books, newspapers, cigarettes, salt, and water supplies, alongside preventing family visits during the strike.

The Israel Prison Service stated that it would consult an ethics committee on force-feeding the striking prisoners if necessary and accused the prisoners of having malicious intentions, releasing a statement saying that "the prisoners’ demand that they should be allowed to continue to plan and direct terror attacks from inside Prisons Service facilities is unacceptable and contravenes all existing security rules."

The hunger strike ended in early September, after 18 days. None of the prisoners' demands were met. The Palestinian interviewed by The New Arab in 2015 claimed that the failure of the strike lay in splintering of the committee leading the strikes into different sub-committees in different prisons and sub-sections of prisons, as well as in the Fatah-Hamas conflict.

== Analysis ==
=== Causes ===
Hussein Al-Zrai'i, a former detainee, has claimed that Palestinians imprisoned by Israel undertake hunger strikes because they are "the only option we have to live in dignity in the face of the inhumane practices of the Israeli authorities."

According to Jessica Montell of Israeli human rights group HaMoked, "hunger strikes are particularly effective in the case of administrative detainees because this is a detention completely outside of the judicial process." According to Palestinian NGO Addameer, "the long history of Palestinian prisoners in mass and individual hunger strikes, reveals the lack of trust in any judicial process and the lack of fair trial guarantees they face under the military and civil court systems of the Israeli occupation."

=== Significance ===
Palestinian hunger strikes are generally considered to be an important aspect of the Israeli-Palestinian conflict. Sahar Francis of Palestinian NGO Addameer has stated that hunger strikes have historically been "the most effective tool [Palestinians in Israeli custody] used to guarantee basic rights and to improve their daily life conditions" in Israeli prisons. According to Mustafa Abu Sneineh of Middle East Eye, "Behind every item in the prisoners' cells, and every right obtained, lies the story of a hunger strike. This applies to the clothes they wear, the books they read, the stationery they write on, the family photos they cherish, and the beds and foam mattresses on which they sleep."

=== Organisation ===
According to Malaka Mohammed Shwaikh and Rebecca Ruth Gouldand of the International Center on Nonviolent Conflict, "most Palestinian hunger strikes were collective protests involving many prisoners and various prison facilities simultaneously. These strikes established prisoners’ committees and standard negotiating procedures. The strikes were disrupted by the authorities who isolated leaders in solitary confinement, preventing communication between prisoners and severing their contacts with the outside world."

According to Hussein Khalili and Imogen Lambert of The New Arab, there exists "a core difference between Hamas and Fatah's attitude towards action inside prisons, where Hamas' priority appears to be freeing their prisoners, rather viewing the prison itself as a site of resistance."

According to Lena Meari of Birzeit University, there has been a shift from collective hunger strikes to hunger strikes undertaken by individual Palestinian prisoners since the 1990s, linked to the "regression of the Palestinian national liberation movement in the post-Oslo era."

=== Gender ===
Some commentators have analysed Palestinian prisoners' hunger strikes through a gendered lens.

=== Israeli responses ===
According to Palestinian NGO Addameer, "hunger strikes are often met with violent and coercive repression by Israeli Prison Service and special units, as well as medical personnel to push detainees to end their hunger strikes. Following hunger strikes, Addameer has documented several cases of raids on prison cells, transfers of hunger strikers to isolation cells, threats of indefinite detention, banning family visitation, reduction of money spent in the canteen."

=== Force-feeding ===
Until the mid-1980s, the Israeli government practised force-feeding of Palestinian prisoners undertaking hunger strikes.

Abdulrahim Nubani, who was detained by the Israeli authorities between 1974 and 1994, has claimed that the force-feeding was "used to break spirits, not to feed prisoners – it was torture," describing his personal experience of being force-fed in 1980: "They tied me down and brought a tube, shoved it down my nose and pushed – I felt my head exploding, down to my stomach. I felt my stomach burn. It was empty and they gave us hot water and salt, lots of salt. I was bleeding and powerless." Mousa Sheikh, who had been imprisoned in 1963 after taking part in a firefight with the Israeli military, described being force-fed in 1970: "The prisoner enters the room handcuffed and legs shackled. There are two police officers on either side of the prisoner, who terrorise him physically and mentally. They poke him harshly in the ribs and on the back of the neck, talking the whole time in a way that is meant to break the prisoner's spirit, saying things like 'you are practically dead now.' The prisoner is tied to a chair so that he can't move. The doctor then sticks the tube up the nose of the prisoner in a very harsh way. When it was done to me, I felt my lungs close as the tube reached my stomach. I almost suffocated. They poured milk down the tube, which felt like fire to me. It was boiling. I could not stay still and danced from the pain. I danced a lot."

After several prisoners died as a result of being force-fed, the Supreme Court of Israel banned the practice.

In 2015, the Knesset passed the Prison Ordinance Law (Amendment No. 48), re-establishing force feeding as a legal practice in cases where a hunger strike posed a risk to human life or to Israeli national security. Israeli Minister of Public Security Gilad Erdan justified the law by saying that "security prisoners are interested in turning a hunger strike into a new type of suicide terrorist attack through which they will threaten the State of Israel." The law was controversial internationally and within Israel, with the Israel Medical Association stating that "forced feeding is equivalent to torture and every physician has the right to refuse to force-feed a hunger striker against his or her will."

=== Relationship with Ireland ===
Some commentators have compared Palestinian prisoners' hunger strikes to hunger strikes held by IRA members during The Troubles, such as the 1981 Irish hunger strike. According to Yousef M. Aljamal of the American Friends Service Committee, "the history of Irish-Palestinian solidarity is long and mutual... I recently contributed to a book – A Shared Struggle: Stories of Irish and Palestinian Hunger Strikers – in which the stories of some of these Palestinian hunger strikers, and their Irish counterparts, are told."

== See also ==
- 2025 Prisoners for Palestine hunger strike
- List of strikes in Palestine
- List of hunger strikes
