= Fernex =

Fernex may refer to:

== People ==
- Joseph Fernex (died 1795), French revolutionary judge
- Michel Fernex (1929–2021), Swiss doctor
- Solange Fernex (1934–2006), French politician

== Places ==
- Fernex or Ferney, France
