= George Rolfe (disambiguation) =

George Rolfe (1808–1871) was a merchant and politician in the Colony of Victoria.

George Rolfe may also refer to:

- George Rolfe (anatomist), professor of surgery (1707), see Professor of Anatomy, Cambridge University
- George Rolfe (director), first director of the Pike Place Market Preservation and Development Authority

== See also ==
- George Rolph (1794–1875), Canadian lawyer and politician
- George Rolph (activist) (born 1953), British activist
