= Ebru Timtik =

Kurdish-Turkish human rights lawyrt (1978–2020)

- Born: 1978
- Died: August 27, 2020 (aged 42); Bakırköy Dr. Sadi Konuk Research and Training Hospital, Istanbul, Turkey
- Occupations: Human rights lawyer and activist
- Known for: Died after hunger striking

Ebru Timtik (1978 – August 27, 2020) was a Kurdish-Turkish human rights lawyer who died after going on hunger strike in pursuit of a fair trial. She was one of a group of 18 lawyers known for representing clients critical of the Turkish government, who were arrested in September 2017.

== Biography ==
Timtik was part of a group of 18 lawyers arrested in September 2017. They were all members of either the Progressive Lawyers Association (Turkish: Çağdaş Hukukçular Derneği, ÇHD) or the People's Law Bureau (Turkish: Halkın Hukuk Bürosu), known for representing clients critical of the Turkish government. These included cases such as the miners who died due to government failings in the Soma mine disaster, Berkin Elvan, Engin Çeber, and Dilek Dogan. In March 2019, the lawyers were found guilty of membership or association with the outlawed Revolutionary People's Liberation Party/Front (DHKP-C) and were sentenced to lengthy prison terms. Timtik was sentenced to 13 years and 6 months in prison and Aytaç Ünsal to 10 years and 6 months. Milena Buyum, Amnesty International's senior campaign manager on Turkey, described the convictions as "a travesty of justice and demonstrate yet again the inability of courts crippled under political pressure to deliver a fair trial." She called for the lawyers to be unconditionally released and for the convictions to be quashed. In October, Timtik's appeal to the Istanbul Regional Court of Appeal was rejected and at the time of her death, her appeal to the Turkish Supreme Court was pending.

== Hunger strike ==
On January 2, 2020, Timtik initiated a hunger-strike to fight for her right to have a fair trial and Ünsal joined her on February 2. On April 5, Timtik and Ünsal declared that they would go through with their fasting until their deaths. On June 1, the International Association of Democratic Lawyers submitted a petition signed by 365 foreign and 400 Turkish lawyers to the Supreme Court urging it to acquit the imprisoned lawyers. In the early hours of July 30, Timtik and Ünsal were taken from the high-security Silivri Prison to separate hospitals in Istanbul. On August 12, 2020, the European Association of Lawyers for Democracy and World Human Rights sent an open letter addressed to the United Nations, expressing their grave concern about the hunger-striking lawyers. Her cousin who visited her in the hospital said she was pressured into breaking her fast: "They are constantly manoeuvring to break her will. They're using every pretext."

After 238 days of fasting, Timtik died on August 27, 2020, weighing only 30 kg. She became the fourth Turkish prisoner to die on a hunger strike in 2020, following the deaths of Helin Bölek, İbrahim Gökçek, and Mustafa Koçak earlier that year.

=== Aftermath ===
Deutsche Welle reported that the Turkish police impeded the participation at the burial ceremony in the cemetery by Timtik's supporters, countering them with armoured vehicles, a helicopter and teargas.

== Reactions to her death ==
News of Timtik's death was met with condemnation by the Turkish judiciary:

- Turkish politician Nesrin Nas posted on Twitter: "I am so sorry. She just wanted a fair trial. A state that turns a deaf ear to its citizens’ demand to a fair trial…Where are we running to?"
- Turkish musician Zülfü Livaneli wrote on Twitter that Timtik's death was the "death of humanity, justice and conscience" in Turkey.
- Turkish opposition politician Sezgin Tanrıkulu in an interview slammed the decision not to release her: "Shame on those who did not give a decision for release. We had begged the Court of Cassation [Supreme Court] to handle this file."
- European Democratic Lawyers tweeted: "We, from all over the world, tried our best, but as a result of injustice, the dysfunctional judicial system of Turkey, we could not get her from their hands."
- The Council of Europe's Commissioner for Human Rights Dunja Mijatović stated: "Ms Timtik’s death is a tragic illustration of the human suffering caused by a judicial system in Turkey that has turned into a tool to silence lawyers, human rights defenders and journalists, through systematic disregard for the most basic principles of the rule of law."
- A statement from the European External Action Service read: "The tragic outcome of their fight for a fair trial painfully illustrates the urgent need for the Turkish authorities to credibly address the human rights situation in the country, which has severely deteriorated in recent years, as well as serious shortcomings observed in the judiciary."

== Award ==
The Council of Bars and Law Societies of Europe (CCBE) bestowed Ebru Timtik posthumously with a Human Rights Award in 2020.
