= Hunger strike of Larry Hebert =

2024 protest action

- Part of the Gaza war protests in the United States
- Larry Hebert on the first day of his hunger strike in front of the White House in Washington, D.C.
- Date: March, April 2024
- Location: Washington, D.C., United States
- Type: Hunger strike
- Motive: Opposition to United States support for Israel's war in Gaza.
- Organised by: Larry Hebert, Veterans For Peace
- Participants: Larry Hebert, Marshall Burns, Jeffrey Berger, Najjam Malik, Margaret Stevens

On March 31, 2024 Larry Hebert, a Senior Airman in the U.S. Air Force, started a hunger strike during an authorized leave from his post. Hebert's leave was terminated on April 9.

The announced purpose of the strike was "to highlight the plight of the starving children of Gaza," demanding that the United States end its military support of Israel's war in Gaza.

== Background ==
Larry Hebert (pronounced eh-BEAR) is a U.S. Air Force Senior Airman and avionics technician assigned to Naval Station Rota, Spain. At the time of his hunger strike, Hebert had been in the military for six years, having enlisted in September 2018.

== Event ==
Larry Hebert in an interview on Democracy Now on April 2, 2024

In mid-March 2024, Hebert, age 26, took authorized leave from his assignment at Naval Station Rota, Spain, and traveled to Washington, D.C. to participate in demonstrations demanding a permanent ceasefire in Gaza and to visit Congressional offices to press for stopping weapons shipments to Israel.

At 10:00 am on Easter Sunday, March 31, 2024, Hebert began his hunger strike on Pennsylvania Avenue in front of the White House. The strike was announced that day by a news release from Veterans For Peace with the stated purpose "to highlight the plight of the starving children of Gaza." He wore a sign that read, "Active duty airman refuses to eat while Gaza starves," with a photograph of an emaciated infant. Hebert noted that he was inspired by the self-immolation of Aaron Bushnell.

Shortly before his hunger strike, Hebert joined Veterans For Peace, an organization that opposes U.S. military actions. The organization argues that U.S. weapons shipments to Israel is a violation of U.S. law, specifically the Foreign Assistance Act, Arms Export Control Act, War Crimes Act, Leahy Law, and the Genocide Convention Implementation Act.

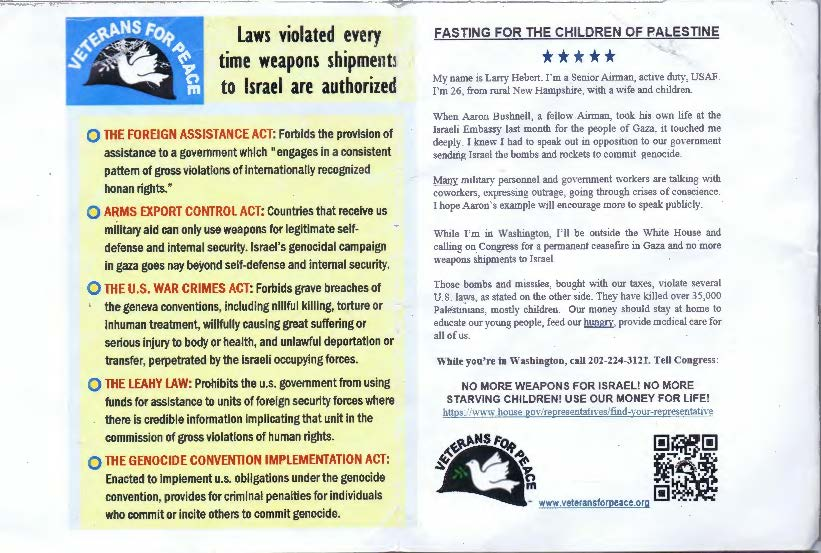
Flier handed out to the public by Larry Hebert during his hunger strike in Washington, D.C. in March and April 2024

His fast was ended abruptly on April 9, when Hebert was ordered to report immediately to Andrews Air Force Base for a return flight to his post in Spain.

Medea Benjamin and Larry Hebert waiting for testimony of Lloyd Austin at a Senate hearing on April 9, 2024

On the second day of his hunger strike, Hebert said he had received at least 30 emails from veterans thanking him for his courage, and noted that in-person reactions were mostly positive.

== See also ==
- Gaza war protests in the United States
- List of hunger strikes
- List of peace activists

== Other coverage ==
- US airman to start hunger strike to draw attention to plight of Gaza's children, Al Jazeera, April 1, 2024
- Gaza Is A "Horror Film" - Palestinian Writer Susan Abulhawa + Journalist Prem Thakker On Al Shifa, Katie Halper, YouTube livestream, April 2, 2024. The program has a bonus segment with Hebert and Ann Wright starting at t = 1:22:33.
- The Active-Duty Airman Refusing to Eat While Gaza Starves, Common Dreams, April 3, 2024
