= Artificial nutrition =

Artificial nutrition may refer to:

- Feeding tube
- Feeding by nasogastric tube
- Parenteral nutrition
