= Lantz v. Coleman =

Lantz v. Coleman is a Connecticut superior court case that addresses the constitutionality of forcibly feeding prison inmates on hunger strikes. The court ruled in favor of force feeding.

== Case ==
The defendant in the case, William B. Coleman, is a British national who was sentenced to eight years in state prison in 2005 for sexually assaulting his wife. She alleged Coleman raped her two days after he filed for custody of their children. He was convicted of sexual assault and unlawful imprisonment. He appealed, arguing that his wife had falsely accused him of rape in order to gain custody of their children. The conviction was affirmed on appeal in 2007.

In September 2007, Coleman stopped eating solid foods. Some time later, he started to refuse all liquids and nutritional supplements, other than occasional milk, juice and water during the Christmas season, to spare his family from his death during the holidays. During this time, his weight dropped from 250 pounds (110 kg) to no more than 100 pounds (45 kg).

The commissioner of the Connecticut Department of Correction, Theresa C. Lantz, sued for an injunction permitting the prison to force-feed Coleman.

Coleman was assisted by the American Civil Liberties Union of Connecticut in presenting his case to Judge James Graham of the Connecticut Superior Court. On May 21, 2009, the court issued the injunction allowing the prison to force-feed Coleman. The decision stated that while mentally competent persons have a right to decline medical treatment, convicts lose some of their rights while imprisoned. The court also ruled allowing Coleman to starve himself to death would violate the prison's obligation to care for the health of convicts, and feeding was a medically harmless process when performed under sedation. Furthermore, Coleman's death from lack of nutrition would potentially cause unrest within the prison, and given his expected release from prison "his death would deprive his innocent, dependent children of his future financial support."

In 2012, Coleman was paroled but soon arrested and imprisoned after refusing to register as a convicted sex offender. In 2014, he was deported to England.

== Significance ==
The Coleman case has pitted several of the nation's leading bioethicists and physicians against the Connecticut prison system. The University of Pennsylvania's Arthur Caplan, who testified for Coleman at the trial, wrote in the Hartford Courant:

Prisoners do not have many rights while in jail. But, one right they do have is the right to protest including the decision not to eat or drink. As horrible as it is to watch someone starve when they need not do so, the state of Connecticut should accept that a competent prisoner may make that choice. I hope that Coleman decides that he has made his point and ends his hunger-strike. But it is not right to use medical treatment to force him not to do so.

== See also ==
- Ian Brady hunger strike
