= 2025 Prisoners for Palestine hunger strike =

Hunger strike in the UK

The Prisoners for Palestine hunger strike was a hunger strike in the United Kingdom that began on 2 November 2025, undertaken by 8 people incarcerated for alleged pro-Palestine protest action. The hunger strike was the biggest in UK prisons since the 1981 Irish hunger strike. All 8 prisoners are being held on remand for alleged direct action at either Elbit Systems UK's Filton research hub in August 2024, or at RAF Brize Norton. The last two of the group, Heba Muraisi and Kamran Ahmed, ended their hunger strikes on 15 January 2026; by then Heba Muraisi's protest had lasted for 73 days.

The hunger strikers' demands related to their prison conditions and remand cases, to the UK's proscription of the direct action network Palestine Action, and to the operation within the UK of subsidiaries of the Israeli weapons manufacturer Elbit Systems. It received attention and support from both within and outside the UK, but throughout the protest David Lammy, the Secretary of State for Justice, declined to meet with the hunger strikers' representatives.

== Background ==
From August 2024 to July 2025, 24 people were remanded to prison in connection with a break-in at Elbit Systems' Filton site that allegedly caused £1 million worth of damages. In July and August 2025, five more people were remanded to prison in connection with a separate break-in at RAF Brize Norton, in which two Voyager aircraft were sprayed with paint. Both actions were publicised and claimed by Palestine Action, which described them as efforts to disrupt Britain's involvement in the ongoing genocide in Gaza. Following the RAF Brize Norton break-in, legislation introduced by then-Home Secretary Yvette Cooper proscribed Palestine Action as a terrorist organisation, the first such designation for a protest group.

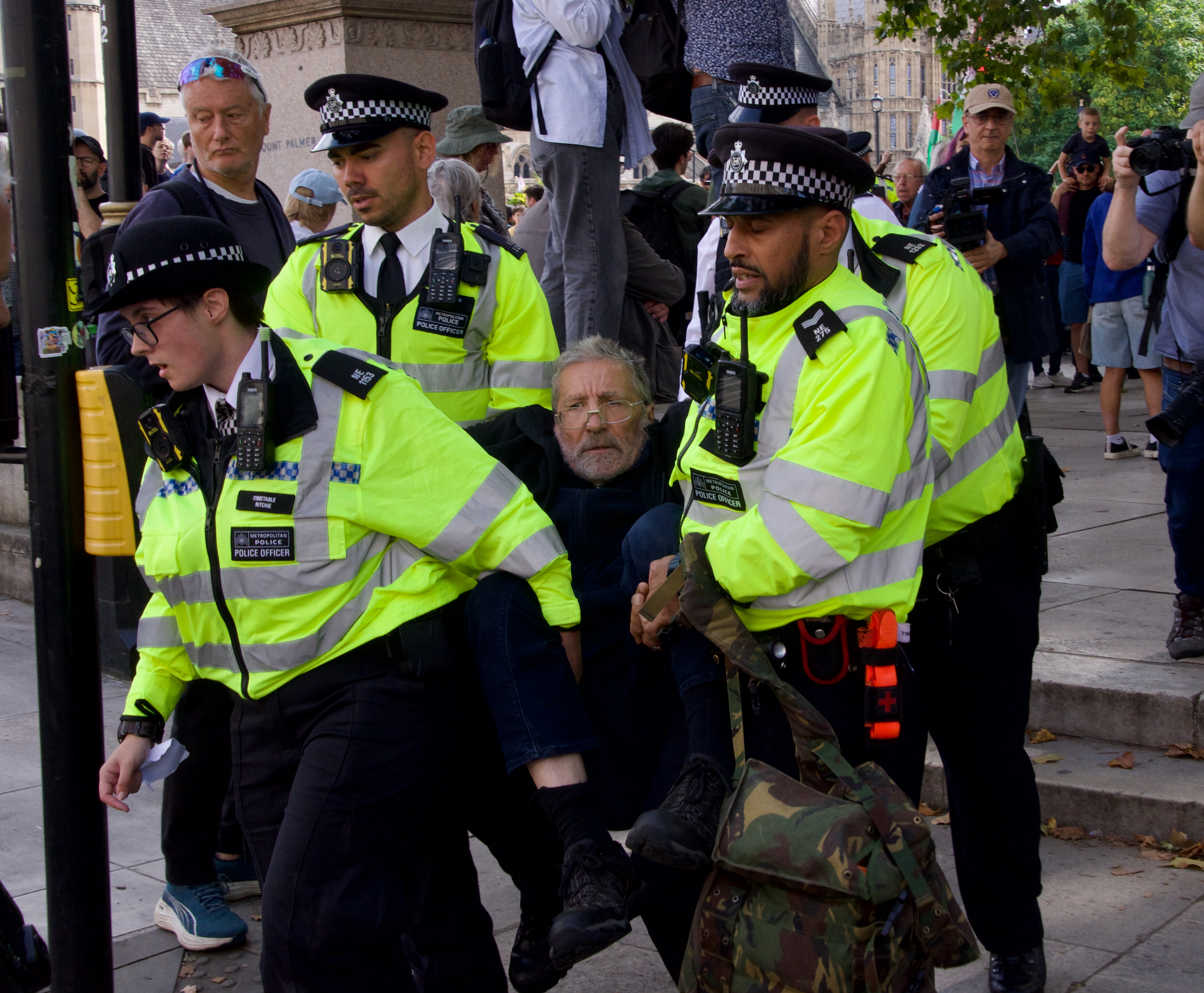
Police arrest a man at a Defend Our Juries protest against the proscription of Palestine Action on 6 September 2025.

The prisoners (known as the Filton 24 and Brize Norton 5) are due to be held on remand for up to two years before they face trial. In all cases, their remand periods will exceed the United Kingdom's standard six-month pre-trial custody time limit. Prisoners' legal representatives and loved ones reported that they faced censorship of mail, restricted contact with friends and family, refusal of access to prison jobs, imposition of 'non-association orders', and hostile treatment by guards who label them 'terrorists'. UN special rapporteurs wrote to the UK government to express concerns about detention conditions and the use of counter-terror legislation in the Filton 24 case in January 2025. Alleged poor prison conditions, including censorship of communications and the removal of a job in the prison library, prompted Teuta 'T' Hoxha, a Filton 24 prisoner held on remand since November 2024, to undertake a solo hunger strike for 28 days from August to September 2025.

== Hunger strike ==
On 20 October 2025, the prisoner-led collective Prisoners for Palestine delivered a letter detailing the hunger strikers' demands to the Home Office. The letter stated that, if the demands were not met, an undisclosed number of prisoners would begin an open-ended hunger strike on 2 November, the anniversary of the Balfour Declaration. Having received no response to these demands, the first two prisoners began refusing food on 2 November.

The eight hunger strikers are members of the 'Filton 24' and 'Brize Norton 5' who are being held on remand. One prisoner, Hoxha, carried out an individual hunger strike from August to September to protest her prison conditions. Another, Lewie Chiaramello, fasted on alternate days due to Type 1 diabetes. Jon Cink ended his hunger strike after 41 days, due to hospitalisation, on 16 December 2025. Umer Khalid, who has underlying health conditions, ended his 13-day hunger strike on the same day. As of 19 December, the hunger strikers were variously held in Bronzefield, Pentonville, Wormwood Scrubs, Peterborough and New Hall prisons.

=== Health and prison conditions ===
The prisoners' conditions deteriorated significantly over the course of their hunger strike. Five were hospitalised. The strikers allege mistreatment and difficulty accessing medical care both in prison and in hospital. At HMP Bronzefield, Amu Gib's food refusal was not logged and medical observations were allegedly not taken for ten days. While hospitalised, prisoners were allegedly held incommunicado, prevented from contacting lawyers or loved ones. NHS doctor James Smith also alleged in a press conference of 18 December 2025 that prisoners had been shackled in hospital, even while using the toilet. On 17 December, Qesser Zuhrah, suffering severe chest pain, breathlessness and abdominal and lower back pain, was hospitalised only after protesters, including the MP Zarah Sultana, gathered outside HMP Bronzefield to demand that she receive urgent medical attention; prison staff had reportedly refused to call an ambulance for Zuhrah since the previous afternoon. Medical professionals and family members warned that the hunger strikers had reached a critical stage of starvation and were at risk of death.

On 21 December, it was reported that two of the hunger strikers, Gib and Kamran Ahmed, had been taken to hospital; Ahmed had already been hospitalised twice before. On 22 December, it was reported that, after 48 days, Qesser Zuhrah, one of the first two hunger strikers, who began the hunger strike on 2 November, had ended her hunger strike. On 24 December, it was reported that, after more than 50 days, a fourth hunger striker, Amu Gib, had ended their protest. This left three remaining detainees (Heba Muraisi, Teuta Hoxha and Kamran Ahmad) on hunger strike, and a fourth intermittently refusing food.

As of 6 January 2026 Heba Muraisi was reported to have difficulty breathing after 65 days on hunger strike.

On 10 January it was reported that two detainees (Muraisi, after 70 days, and Ahmad at 63 days of hunger strike) remained on full hunger strike, with a third (with pre-existing health conditions) refusing food on alternate days. Concerns grew for their health.

The last two of the group who had continued to refuse food, Heba Muraisi and Kamran Ahmed, ended their hunger strikes on 15 January 2026; by then Heba Muraisi's protest had lasted for 73 days.

== Demands ==
The prisoners' five demands are as follows:

1. End all censorship (of their communications within prison)
2. Immediate bail (for those on remand for Palestine-related protests)
3. Right to a fair trial (including publication of relevant documents around Elbit Systems and British and Israeli state communications)
4. Deproscription of Palestine Action and dropping of the "terrorism connection" attached to activists' cases by the Crown Prosecution Service
5. Shutdown of all UK sites of Elbit Systems and subsidiaries, and no contracts between Elbit and the British state

== Responses ==
=== Protests ===
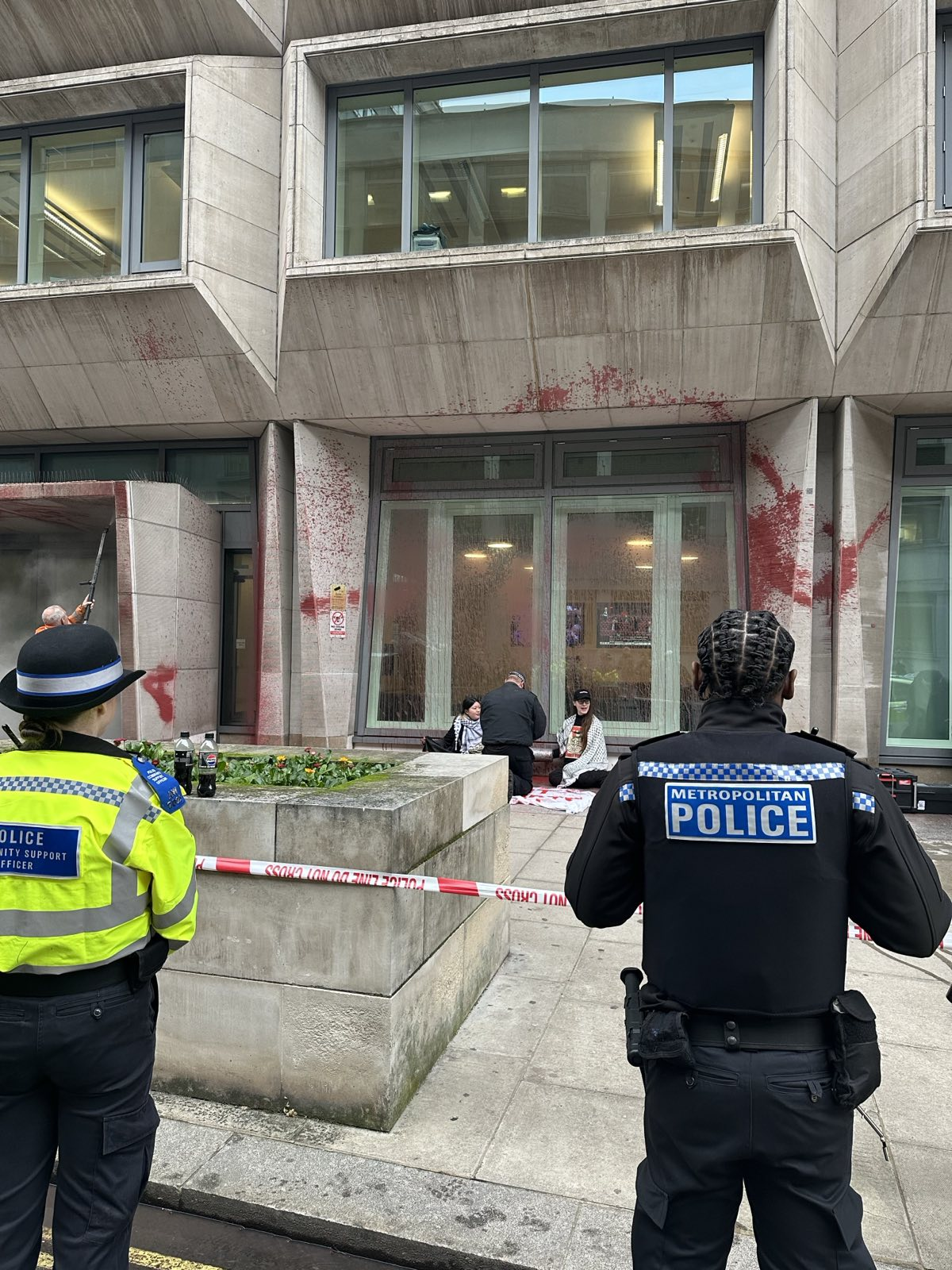
Protestors sit on the ground outside the Ministry of Justice in London.

Several protests in support of the hunger strikers have been held outside London government buildings, including at the Ministry of Justice offices near St James's Park, London. On 12 December 2025, two activists daubed the building with red paint to draw attention to David Lammy's refusal to meet with strikers' representatives. On 17 December, a rally took place for the hunger strikers where several people were arrested for allegedly chanting "globalise the intifada".

From the night of 16 December 2025 through late afternoon on 17 December, protestors travelled to HMP Bronzefield in Surrey to demand that Qesser Zuhrah be taken to hospital to receive medical attention. After a 17-hour long standoff with prison staff and police, resulting in 3 arrests, prison staff allowed an ambulance to enter the prison and transport Zuhrah to hospital.

Protestors have also rallied outside HMP Pentonville, where Kamran Ahmed is held, calling for his release and demanding improved treatment for the prisoners. On 18 December, protest group Led By Donkeys projected a video onto the wall of the prison in which Palestine activist and former prisoner Francesca Nadin called for urgent action on the strike.

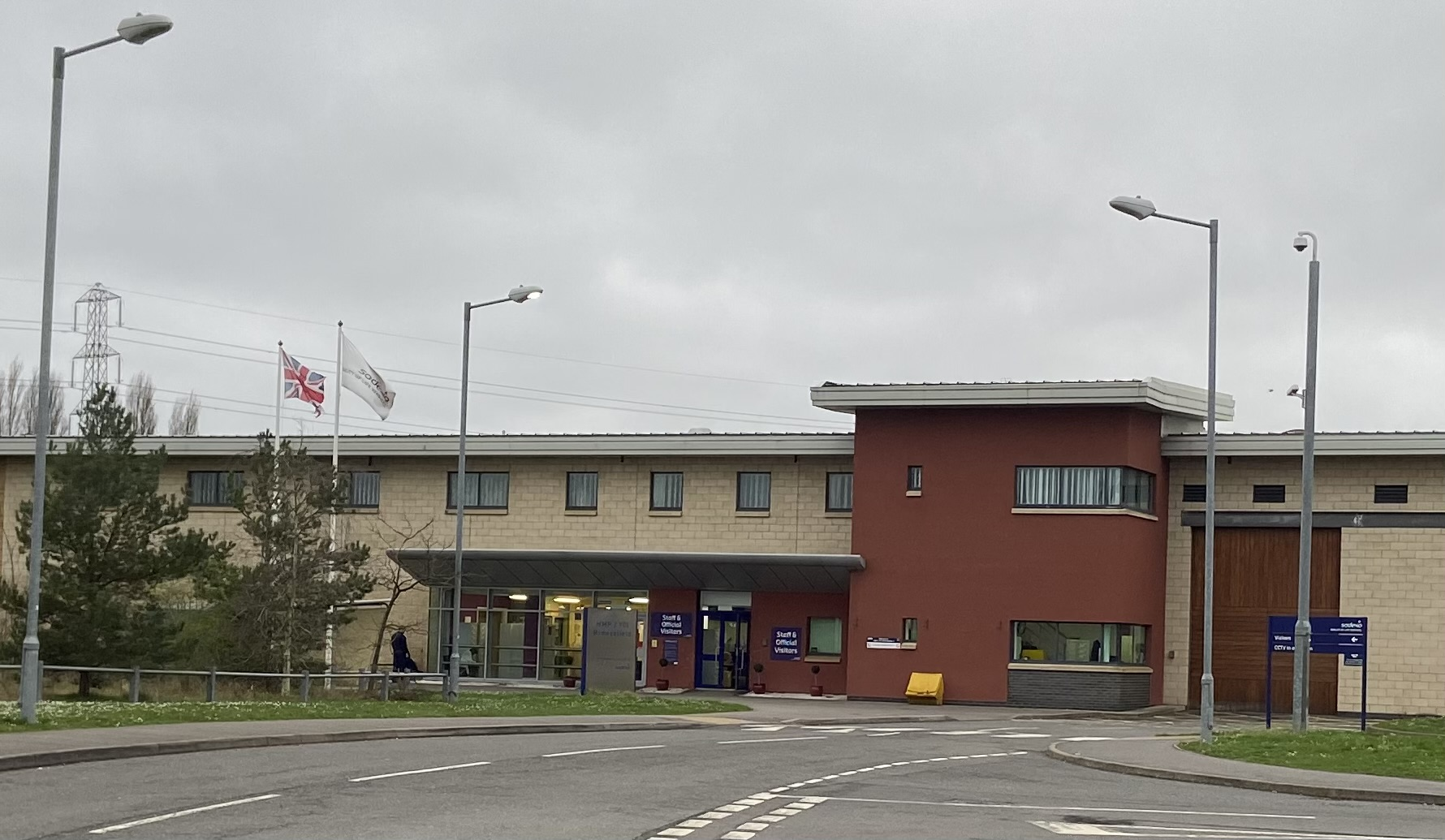
HMP Bronzefield, where a protest on 17 December 2025 took place

A protest on 22 December saw Greta Thunberg arrested for 'displaying a placard in support of a proscribed organisation'.

Demonstrations and banner drops have been held in other cities including Bristol, Oxford, Sheffield, and Dublin. Protests have also occurred further afield, including outside British embassies in Boston, Tel Aviv and Prague.

=== Government ministers and prisons ===
Labour government officials such as David Lammy, the Secretary of State for Justice, declined to meet with the hunger strikers' representatives. On 18 December 2025, The National reported that almost 900 health workers had written to David Lammy and Health Secretary Wes Streeting to demand specialist care and hospital monitoring for the hunger strikers.

Government ministers have denied accusations that the hunger strikers are being mistreated in prison, and have defended the prison service's management of the strike thus far. As of 19 December 2025, ministers have publicly refused to meet with representatives of the hunger strikers, or with concerned MPs. When Jeremy Corbyn, the MP for the constituency of hunger striker Amu Gib, wrote to David Lammy to request a meeting, Lammy replied that "it would not be appropriate" to meet while the prisoners are subject to ongoing legal proceedings. When Corbyn raised his request in Parliament, junior minister Jake Richards rejected the possibility again, saying that the Ministry of Justice was acting in accordance with "robust and proper guidance" around hunger strikes. On 18 December 2025, in response to further debate in parliament, Commons leader Alan Campbell said that it "couldn't be further from the truth" that the government and prison service were trying to '"break the bodies"' of the hunger strikers. Prisons minister Lord Timpson said that the prison service was "very experienced at dealing with hunger strikes", and was following "processes" that "are well-established and [...] work very well".

In response to enquiries by journalists, an HMP Bronzefield spokesperson declined to comment on specific individuals on hunger strike, stating that "all prisoners are managed in line with the policies and procedures governing the entire UK prison estate".

=== Other politicians ===
On 1 December 2025, Labour MP John McDonnell tabled an Early Day Motion in the House of Commons on the hunger strike. It expressed "extreme concern" about the prison conditions leading prisoners to undertake a hunger strike, and urged Secretary of State for Justice, David Lammy, to intervene. It received 62 signatures from members across several UK parties, including Labour, the Greens, the Liberal Democrats, Plaid Cymru, the Scottish National Party and Your Party.

Green Party Deputy Leader Mothin Ali, Your Party MP Zarah Sultana, and Independent Jeremy Corbyn also visited hunger strikers Amu Gib and Qesser Zuhrah in prison at HMP Bronzefield in December 2025. Sultana was also among those who protested outside Bronzefield on 17 December. The protest attended by Sultana led to two arrests for offences of assault on prison and police staff, and one for criminal damage.

The Restore Britain MP for Great Yarmouth, Rupert Lowe, on the other hand, described the strikers as "Palestine lunatics" who were "begging for attention" in a tweet.

=== Media ===
Bart Cammaerts of the London School of Economics said that the hunger strike received "very low" media coverage up to 10 December 2025 in comparison to past hunger strikes.

On 19 December 2025, The Guardian's Editorial Board published an article criticising what it characterised as the government's efforts to ignore the hunger strike. They also expressed support for the deproscription of Palestine Action and for the strikers' demand for immediate bail. Also on 19 December, Ben Cohen, an analyst working for the Foundation for Defense of Democracies, published an article in The Jerusalem Post describing the strike as a "bid for martyrdom" and as part of a growing pattern of "terror-inflected, radical activism" practised by the "pro-Hamas movement", particularly Palestine Action.

=== International ===
Amnesty International UK gave a press release on 5 December 2025 warning about what it viewed as the misuse of terrorism powers against hunger strikers. Responding on 11 December to reports that five activists on hunger strike had been hospitalised, Kerry Moscogiuri, Director of Campaigns and Communications at the charity, described the news as sending "chills down the spine" and believed that the activists were victims of "the UK's excessively broad terrorism laws".

Support and concern for the hunger strikers were expressed by environmental activist Greta Thunberg, Palestinian-American US Congresswoman Rashida Tlaib, Irish author Sally Rooney, and Bernadette Devlin McAliskey, a spokesperson for the 1980–1981 Smash H-Block Campaign.

Georges Ibrahim Abdallah, a Lebanese revolutionary imprisoned for 41 years in France and released in July 2025, also expressed his support for the hunger strikers and Palestine Action more broadly. Former Irish republican prisoners Frankie Quinn and Tommy McKearney, the latter of whom participated in the 1980 H-Block hunger strike, likewise issued statements of support. Former Guantanamo detainee Mansoor Adayfi, now resident in the UK, has also begun a hunger strike in solidarity with the Prisoners for Palestine strikers.

United Nations human rights experts expressed concerns for the rights of the hunger strikers and criticised their reported treatment.

== See also ==
- Gaza war protests in the United Kingdom
- Palestinian prisoners' hunger strikes
- Filton Elbit Systems break-in
