= Fast for Life =

Awareness campaign for nuclear disarming

International Fast For Life (IFFL) was a prolonged fast in favor of nuclear disarmament that spawned the Fast For Life movement. The context of this event took place during an era of escalation of the U.S./Russian Cold War. Its purpose was to promote a redirection of international government efforts away from nuclear arms and toward feeding the poor. A poster for the event urged supportive participation in two events: a one-day fast on August 6 or 27, 1983 and a week-long fast beginning September 10, 1983. The core peace action culminated in August 1983 when participants in five countries began a fast on August 6, the anniversary of the atomic bombing of Hiroshima and refused to end their fast until "only when negotiations at Geneva indicate that a halt will be called to the spread of nuclear weapons."

While the participants abstained from food, the protest event garnered major media coverage, commentaries, and open letters of both support and criticism, as well as inspired thousands of people around the world to fast and hold supportive demonstrations.

In objectives, the International Fast For Live movement is related to the Plowshares Movement. Each would rather the powers-that-be feed the world's inhabitants rather than harm them and they each hope to bring about the better world in which that occurs by inspiring others to care and polarize on the contrasting issues of nuclear disarmament vs. world hunger. Given the response around the world and recognition by several world leaders, it's apparent the IFFL's 1983 efforts were effective, to a degree. Before they even began their fast, one commentator, Arthur Hoppe of the San Francisco Chronicle said after hearing about it, that he'd already been inspired by the IFFL to join the one-day fast on August 6. "Admittedly, this is a minuscule accomplishment for them (having won over another ally) -- a tiny drop of oil on the storm-tossed ocean of world affairs. But if it were to be multiplied by a hundred, a thousand, a... Who knows? Our leaders might renounce their deadly geo-political games, beat their missiles into plowshares and war no more. Anyway, isn't it pretty to think so?"

For eight of the core participants, the fast ended after 40 days. Their decision to end there was made two days after Californian faster, Dorothy Granada had lost forty pounds and partial eyesight. Didier Mainguy ended his fast early, on the 30th day, after experiencing blood pressure problems. In Canada, however, participant Karen Harrison ended her fast on October 5 after a full 61 days, only when Canadian Prime Minister Pierre Trudeau conceded to meet with her to discuss nuclear disarmament. Former chancellor Willy Brandt also visited with the fasters in Bonn, where he pledged to seek immediate support from his Social Democratic Party to postpone deployment of missiles in Germany. West German Chancellor Helmut Kohl wrote the fasters, stating his appreciation of their goals. Kohl would later be prominently instrumental in the reunification of Germany and also, in cooperation with French President Mitterrand, with the later formation of the European Union. Given their shared peace agenda, it's no surprise that in France, two of President Mitterrand's ministers visited with the fasters in Paris on the 35th day of the fast with a letter from the President who agreed to meet with them after the fast ended.

Unfortunately, the IFFL open-ended fast failed to elicit a supportive public response from either U.S. President Reagan or Russian Secretary Yuri Andropov. However, within less than a decade the world would see the Malta Summit and the fall of the Berlin Wall in 1989, and in 1991, the official end of the Cold War that had lasted for almost half a century, as well as the US and Soviet Union signing the Strategic Arms Reduction Treaty I, which set a framework for the reduction of U.S./Russian nuclear stockpiles.

In recognition of the widespread attention the fast brought to the issue of nuclear weapons disarmament, International Fast For Life was nominated for the Nobel Peace Prize. The direct result of the protests is not certain, but their legacy was a reinvigoration of the nuclear disarmament movement. Since then, unrelated protest actions have also referenced this event, such as Cesar Chavez' hunger strike that he called a "Fast For Life" in 1988, intended to draw attention to the harmful effects of pesticides on farm workers. The 1986 Veterans' Fast For Life protested U.S. President Ronald Reagan's pro-Contra policies in Central America. A more recent, similarly-titled event was the 2011 Darfur Fast For Life that called for a re-invigoration of international intervention against genocide in Darfur.

== Core participants ==
Paris, France

Solange Fernex
Michel Nodet
Francisco Alejo
Jacky Guyon

San Francisco, California, US

André Larivière
Dorothy Granada
Mitsuyoshi Kohjima
Charles Gray

Bonn, West Germany

Johanna Jordan
Andrea Elukovich

Toronto, Canada

Brian Burch
Karen Harrison
Didier Mainguy

Rome, Italy

Tom Siemer

== Roots of the 1983 International Fast For Life ==
In December 1978, 180 people were on trial for twice entering and occupying the Trident submarine base at Bangor, Washington in May of that year. During the campaign, a fast moved many members of the British Columbia Parliament to support a resolution opposing Trident. Testimony to the power of fasting indicated to Charles Gray, one of the first three participants that would announce the 1983 fast, the power of fasting after he recognized the frustration that resulted following civil disobedience actions that were unproductive, since it allowed police to stop life-affirming action. The objective was to overcome the inability to put morality and sense above a death-promoting legal system, that being an escalating stockpile of nuclear weapons by governments around the world. Shortly afterwards, Gray, meditating in the Friends' Meeting House in Eugene, Oregon, imagined a fast that he thought might have a chance of stopping the nuclear arms race – an international open-ended fast. The idea was so fraught with risk to life that he did nothing publicly for almost a year.

Finally, Gray concluded that the nuclear crisis of that time was so grave that people of peace may have to offer up their lives in an effort to prevent the continuation of the silent holocaust of world hunger and the impending holocaust of nuclear fire. These are the origins of the Fast For Life. With the help of colleagues a letter was circulated to about a hundred people in the peace movement. After a favorable response, a small group was formed in Eugene - the Nonviolent Tactics Development Project (NTDP). A pamphlet titled "First Step" was published so that others could gain experience for a major fast in the event that the nuclear arms race was not stopped by Hiroshima Day, August 6, 1983. In the fall of 1980, Solange Fernex, President of Women for Peace in France, and a founding member of France's Green Party, adopted NTDP methods in Western Europe.

A 24-page guide to political fasting was produced in 1980 giving a brief history of political fasting, how fasts should be conducted, and how to organize for a political fast. There followed in June 1982 a Fast for Disarmament originating in Washington, D.C., and aimed at the United Nations Special Session on Nuclear Disarmament in New York. At this time Gray and Granada met for the first time with Fernex. On June 19, 1982, the three announced that if the development, testing, production and deployment of nuclear weapons had not been stopped by the symbolic date of August 6, 1983, then they would begin an open-ended fast. Throughout this fast, designed to appeal to conscience, fasters would be guided by Gandhi's principles of non-violence. In introducing the Fast, it was noted that the struggle for peace and justice requires that non-violent actions be commensurate with the evil faced, fasting being such an action. As with all non-violent methods, suffering is taken upon oneself and not imposed on the opponent. The Fast For Life is seen as an experiment in truth, seeking change through moral suasion.

== Developments through August 6, 1983 ==
Preparations began in earnest following the June 1982 fast. The months through to the beginning of the Fast saw preparation among groups in many countries commencing one-day-a-week fasts or longer fasts while communicating as widely as possible to organizations, church leaders and individuals the approaching Fast's commencement. For many, there was the important task of connecting the link between world hunger and the arms race. Besides support being established in the U.S., Solange Fernex traveled to Japan to attend the Conference Against A and H Bombs before visits to European countries and then to India for the Non-Aligned Nations Conference in March 1983 where disarmament, survival and co-existence in the age of nuclear weapons was a chief issue on the agenda. Endorsements came from many groups, including Clergy and Laity Concerned and the War Resisters League, but the American Friends Service Committee and Fellowship of Reconciliation would not endorse. In November 1982 Gray joined an international hunger strike in Comiso, Italy, the U.S. base for Pershing and Cruise missiles. Gray later traveled to Japan and New Zealand, countries that would become involved in the Fast For Life. In January 1983, Fast headquarters in the U.S. moved from Eugene, Oregon to San Francisco. From April 12–24 an international meeting was held at the Community of the Ark near Rodez, France. The tasks were to establish goals for the Fast and consider application from fasters. The international meeting adopted an "Appeal to people, institutions and governments to take action to stop the nuclear arms race". By June 1983, Oakland and Paris had been chosen as the sites for the fasting centers. It was agreed that fasters, with advisers, would make their own decisions concerning continuation and termination to end the fast at any time, and would receive the full support of the Fast For Life. (In France the fast was called Jeûne pour la Vie.)

== August 6, 1983 ==
Thousands of people had pledged to participate in support fasts from all over the world. While many fasted one day a week, others took upon themselves longer fasts, often three to 10 day fasts. While records are incomplete, to the best knowledge of organizers, there were more than 150 fasts in 24 countries around the world, mostly in North America and Europe, but also Japan and New Zealand. Communications were not possible to establish with East Germany, but reports from individuals in the Fast movement suggest that as many as 21 people were fasting there. In Italy alone, 44 support groups came into being to boost that country's small peace movement. 86 groups were formed in France and a Fast For Life banner was hung at the Arc de Triomphe where 328 people were arrested – France's largest civil disobedience action against nuclear weapons. Over 100 groups were born in West Germany. Former chancellor Willy Brandt visited with the fasters in Bonn and pledged to seek immediate support from his Social Democratic Party to postpone deployment of missiles in Germany. Chancellor Kohl wrote the fasters stating his appreciation of their goals. In France, two of President Mitterrand's ministers visited with the fasters in Paris on the 35th day of the fast with a letter from the President who agreed to meet with them after the fast ended. Didier Mainguy ended his fast on the 30th day after experiencing blood pressure problems. On September 13 - the 38th day of the Fast - Karen Harrison met with Pierre Trudeau in Ottawa. Trudeau received a list of proposals from the IFFL and stressed that he sincerely wanted a halt to the arms race. With supporters, Harrison also met with other administration officials as well as with embassy representatives of both the Soviet Union and the United States. On October 6, the 61st day, Harrison broke her fast recognizing that the Fast For Life could continue in other positive ways. In Scotland, an Open Letter was published urging a policy of international aid and bringing an end to the escalating arms race. The letter was signed by leaders of all the major churches in Scotland and handed in to the Queen at Balmoral Castle in Aberdeenshire, and Prime Minister Thatcher in London, as well as being sent to all members of parliament.

== The end of the Fast ==
By September, it was the opinion of many supporters that the Fast had made a significant contribution to the peace movement. By the 6th week, the presidents of the World Council of Churches and the U.S. National Council of Churches cabled and urged an end to the Fast, as did some congressmen. A message was sent to fasters from Rev. Philip Potter, General Secretary of the World Council of Churches, commending the life-affirming action having heard the testimonies of thousands from around the world. Part of the message read, "Your fasting has fed the solidarity of all who hunger for disarmament. In your weakness you have made us strong." The message called on the fasters to end their fast, having "encouraged the representatives of the member churches of the World Council to commit themselves further in this way". With doctors increasingly fearful, fasters at the three centers (Oakland, Bonn and Paris) decided on September 13 to end their fast September 15. Andrea Elukovich continued three more days. In early October, the French fasters were granted a two-hour audience with President Mitterrand where they affirmed their opposition to nuclear buildup and testing in Polynesia. The final edition of "The Date Is Set" (November 1983) chronicled that French priest Joseph Pyronnet fasted for 15 days until October 18 when he held a press conference as bishops assembled for the Synod of Reconciliation. On October 30, Tom Siemer reported a letter he presented to the World Catholic Bishops' Synod was read aloud by Cardinal Loerschreider of Brazil. The Synod adopted the terms of Tom's letter by issuing a summary which condemned nuclear weapons, and signed by 15 Catholic communities around Rome. On October 24 in Stockholm, Sweden, significant blockades were held at the British, West German and Italian embassies following a day on non-violence training. Further actions also occurred throughout Europe in the months following the end of the fast. An international meeting was held in Lyon, France on September 24–25, 1983, where two hundred people assembled. Acknowledging the power that fasting had shown, the gathering undertook to pursue the same aims; the moral pressure on governments to respond to the Fast's appeals for greater justice in this shared world would be maintained until a reversal in the escalation of nuclear weapons occurs, and real attempts to confront the plight of the world's hungry are made. Alan Burns, from the Scottish support group, agreed to act as international coordinator to maintain communications between participating countries. According to Alan Burns, this was continued through the summer of 1984, when an international gathering took place in Oxford, England on June 1–3 with about 20 people participating to assess the Fast's effect.
