= Kostas Sakkas =

Greek Anarchist (born 1984)

- Born: 1984 (age 41–42); Marousi
- Movement: Anarchism

Kostas Sakkas is a Greek anarchist who was charged with belonging to the Conspiracy of Cells of Fire and aggravated possession of weapons after his arrest at a warehouse where arms were found. Held for two and half years without trial, he did a hunger strike in the 2010s. He was freed at the end of 2025.

== Biography ==
He was charged with participating in the Conspiracy of Cells of Fire though both he and the CCF deny this. He had been on a hunger strike starting June 4, 2013 in protest of his detention for two and a half years without trial.

Sakkas' long detention, along with his hunger strike has led the political party Syriza call for his release. In response to this, the New Democracy party stated that "SYRIZA should forget the lessons in democracy" and should "stop defending all kinds of people accused of anarchy and terrorism."

He was freed at the end of 2025.
