= Solange Fernex =

French activist and politician (1934-2006)

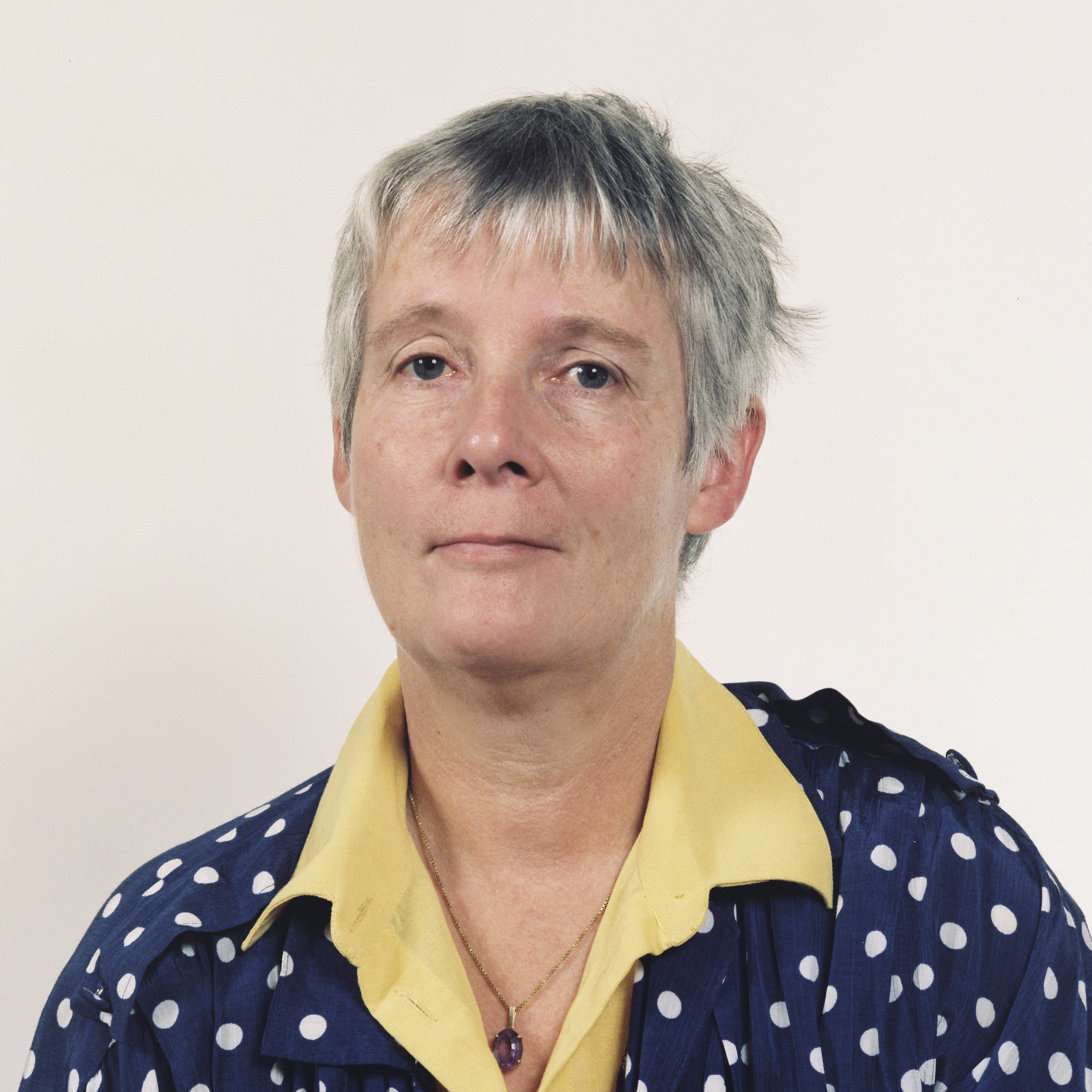
- Solange Fernex, 1979
- Born: 15 April 1934; Strasbourg, France
- Died: 11 September 2006 (aged 72); Biederthal, France
- Occupations: Green activist, politician
- Political party: Green Party (France)
- Spouse: Michel Fernex
- Children: 4

Solange Fernex (15 April 1934 – 11 September 2006) was a French environmental and pacifist activist and politician. One of the environmental movement's pioneers in Europe, she helped found the French Green Party and was a member of the European Parliament for five years.

She advocated for a wide range of issues, including nonviolence, world peace, nuclear disarmament, alternative energy, and feminism. In 2019, a school in her hometown of Strasbourg, France, was named after Fernex.

== Early years ==
Fernex was born in Strasbourg, France. When she was only six, her father died as a French soldier fighting in World War II. She later said that sparked her commitment to nonviolence.

While studying biology in college, she met Swiss physician Michel Fernex, who specializes in tropical diseases. The couple married and moved to Africa, where two of their four children were born. Upon returning, they lived in an old farmhouse in Biederthal, near the Swiss border, where they installed a solar energy system and raised their family.

== Green activism ==
Upon returning to France, Fernex founded a chapter of the third world relief group, Terre des hommes. She worked to preserve historic homes and assisted with the "squatting" movement to successfully protest a proposed lead factory on the Rhine River and a nearby chemical plant. She also joined activists in opposing nuclear power plants, including one planned in Wyhl in southwestern Germany, where she camped in a protest community near the site.

In 1977, Fernex was elected to her town council and remained active on it for 24 years. In 1979, she led the Europe-Ecologie political movement for the environmental group's first European elections, which obtained 4.39 percent for a total of 888,134 votes in France. That same year, she founded the women-led peace organization, Femmes pour la Paix, which she headed until 1996.

In 1983, she participated in the Fast for Life movement, fasting 38 days in Paris for nuclear disarmament. The following year, she co-founded the Green Party with Antoine Waechter. She was the lead organizer in Europe of the Walk of the People – A Pilgrimage for Life, a transcontinental peace walk from the United States to Russia that covered 7,000 miles in 1984 and 1985.

== Chernobyl, European Parliament, later years ==
After the Chernobyl nuclear accident in 1986, Fernex stepped up her efforts to help the radiation victims. She and her husband later founded Children of Chernobyl, focusing on youthful victims. She frequently claimed that the authorities had grossly underestimated the number of victims.

In 1989, Fernex won election to the European Parliament, representing the Green Party in France through 1994. As head of the Agriculture Committee and member of the Fishery Sub-Commission, she lobbied for organic farming regulations to outline how to obtain an organic certification for food.

Between 1995 and 2003, Fernex chaired the French chapter of the Women’s International League for Peace and Freedom. She was also vice president of the International Peace Bureau in Geneva for four years in the 1990s. In 2001, she received the Nuclear-Free Future Award from the German-based foundation for her lifetime work against nuclear weapons.

== Death and legacy ==
By 2003, Fernex had acquired cancer, causing her to have to reduce her activities. She died on September 11, 2006, in Biederthal. She wrote a book on her work, A Life for a Life (La Vie pour la Vie). The French film production company Dora Films did a documentary on her in 2014 called The Little Spark.

== See also ==
- List of peace activists
