= Gastric intubation =

Feeding tube going into the stomach through the nose and throat

Nasogastric intubation
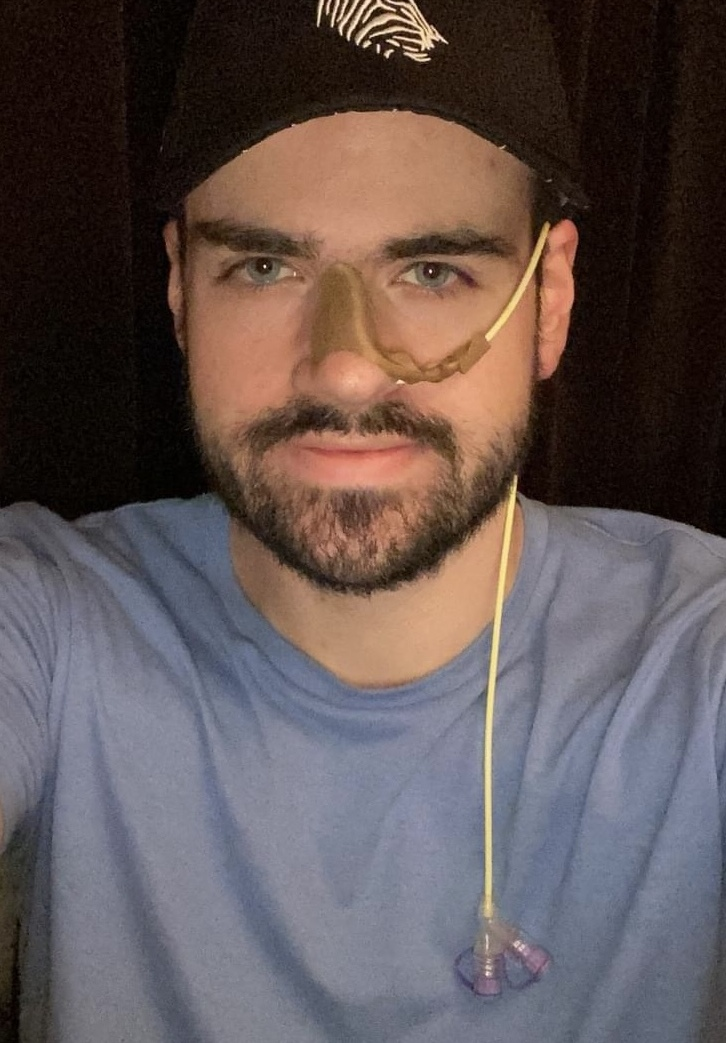
- A man with a nasogastric feeding tube through which feed and medicine can be delivered to the stomach using either a pump or gravity

Nasogastric intubation is a medical process involving the insertion of a plastic tube (nasogastric tube or NG tube) through the nose, down the esophagus, and down into the stomach. Orogastric intubation is a similar process involving the insertion of a plastic tube (orogastric tube) through the mouth. Abraham Louis Levin invented the NG tube. Nasogastric tube is also known as Ryle's tube in Commonwealth countries, after John Alfred Ryle.

== Uses ==
A nasogastric tube is used for feeding and administering drugs and other oral agents such as activated charcoal. For drugs and for minimal quantities of liquid, a syringe is used for injection into the tube. For continuous feeding, a gravity based system is employed, with the solution placed higher than the patient's stomach. If accrued supervision is required for the feeding, the tube is often connected to an electronic pump which can control and measure the patient's intake and signal any interruption in the feeding. Nasogastric tubes may also be used as an aid in the treatment of life-threatening eating disorders, especially if the patient is not compliant with eating. In such cases, a nasogastric tube may be inserted by force for feeding against the patient's will under restraint. Such a practice may be highly distressing for both patients and healthcare staff.

Nasogastric aspiration (suction) is the process of draining the stomach's contents via the tube. Nasogastric aspiration is mainly used to remove gastrointestinal secretions and swallowed air in patients with gastrointestinal obstructions. Nasogastric aspiration can also be used in poisoning situations when a potentially toxic liquid has been ingested, for preparation before surgery under anesthesia, and to extract samples of gastric liquid for analysis.

If the tube is to be used for continuous drainage, it is usually appended to a collector bag placed below the level of the patient's stomach; gravity empties the stomach's contents. It can also be appended to a suction system; however, this method is often restricted to emergency situations, as the constant suction can easily damage the stomach's lining. In non-emergency situations, intermittent suction is often applied giving the benefits of suction without the untoward effects of damage to the stomach lining.

Suction drainage is also used for patients who have undergone a pneumonectomy in order to prevent anesthesia-related vomiting and possible aspiration of any stomach contents. Such aspiration would represent a serious risk of complications to patients recovering from this surgery.

== Types ==
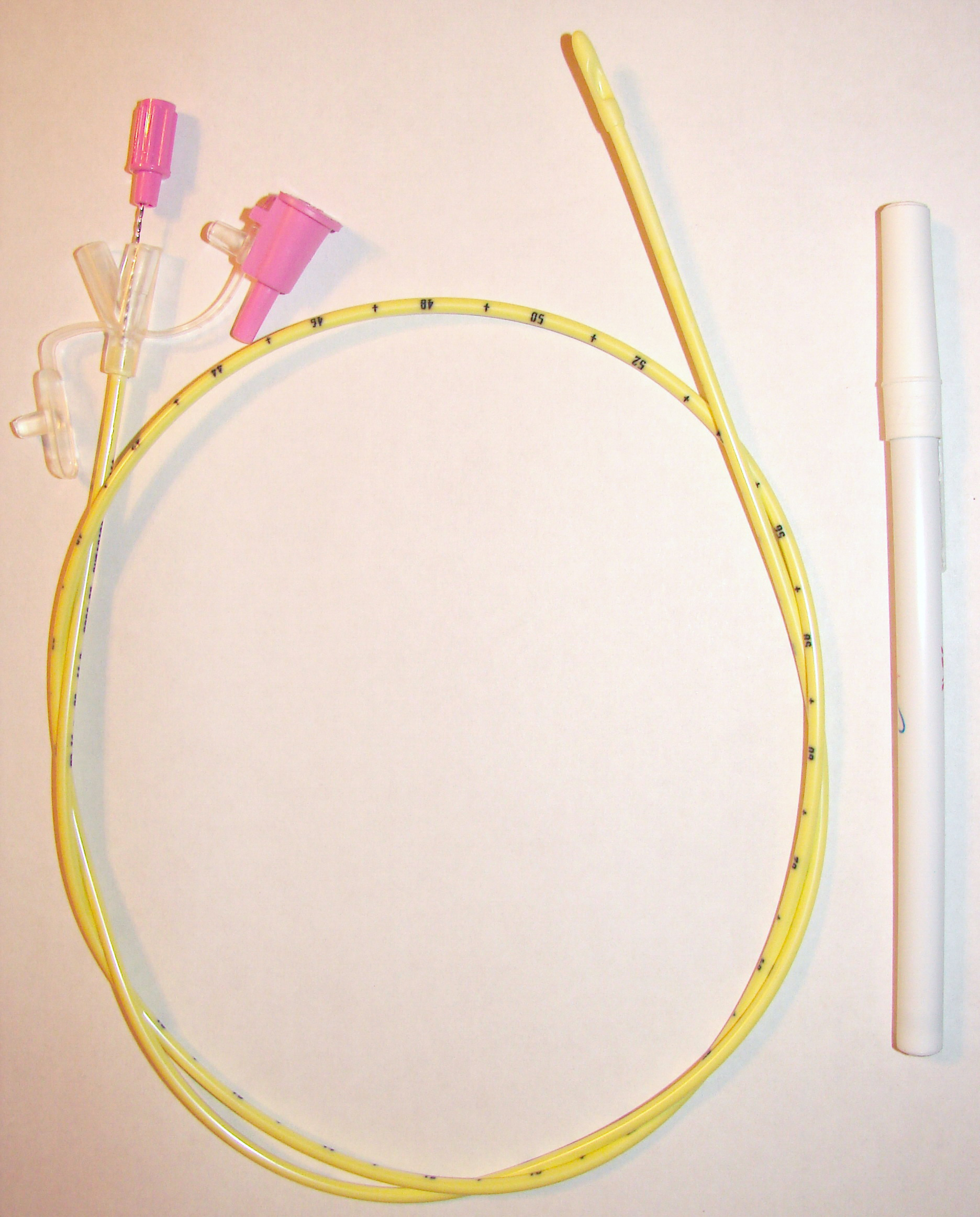
Polyurethane NG tube (Viasys Corflo), 8 Fr × 36 in (91 cm). This fine bore tube is appropriate for longer use (up to 4 weeks).

Types of nasogastric tubes include:

- Levin catheter, which is a single lumen, small bore NG tube. It is more appropriate for administration of medication or nutrition. This type of catheter tends to be more prone to suctioning against the stomach lining, which can cause damage and interfere with future function of the tube.
- Salem Sump catheter, which is a large bore NG tube with double lumen. This avails for aspiration in one lumen, and venting in the other to reduce negative pressure and prevent gastric mucosa from being drawn into the catheter.
- Dobhoff tube, which is a small bore NG tube with a weight at the end intended to pull it by gravity during insertion. The name "Dobhoff" refers to its inventors, surgeons Robert Dobbie and James Hoffmeister, who invented the tube in 1975.

== Materials ==
Nasogastric tubes are available in a variety of different materials, each with their own unique properties.

- Polypropylene – This material is most common. It is less likely to kink, which can be beneficial for placement, but its rigidity makes it less suitable to be used for long term feeding.
- Latex – These tubes tend to be thicker and can be difficult to place without proper lubrication. Latex tends to break down at faster rates compared to other materials. Allergies to latex are relatively common and latex tubes are more likely to be recognized as a foreign object by the body.
- Silicone – Especially useful in patients with known latex allergies. Silicone tubes tend to be thinner and more pliable. This can be useful in some situations but can also be more prone to rupture under stress.

== Technique ==
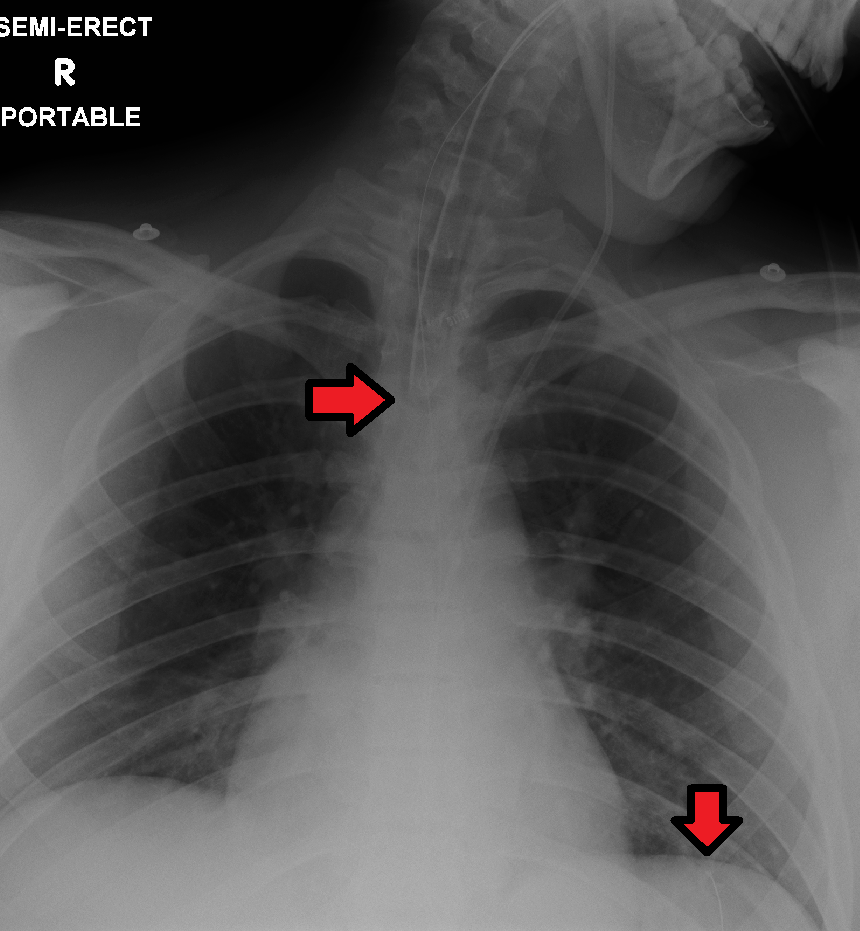
An endotracheal tube and nasogastric tube as seen on CXR. Both in good position.

Before an NG tube is inserted, it must be measured from the tip of the patient's nose, loop around their ear and then down to roughly 3–5 cm (1–2 in) below the xiphoid process. The tube is then marked at this level to ensure that the tube has been inserted far enough into the patient's stomach. Many commercially available stomach and duodenal tubes have several standard depth markings, for example 46 cm (18 in), 56 cm (22 in), 66 cm (26 in) and 76 cm (30 in) from distal end; infant feeding tubes often come with 1 cm depth markings. The end of a plastic tube is lubricated (local anesthetic, such as 2% xylocaine gel, may be used; in addition, nasal vasoconstrictor and anesthetic spray may be applied before the insertion) and inserted into one of the patient's anterior nares. Treatment with 2.0 mg of IV midazolam greatly reduces patient stress. The tube should be directed straight towards the back of the patient as it moves through the nasal cavity and down into the throat. When the tube enters the oropharynx and glides down the posterior pharyngeal wall, the patient may gag; in this situation the patient, if awake and alert, is asked to mimic swallowing or is given some water to sip through a straw, and the tube continues to be inserted as the patient swallows. Once the tube is past the pharynx and enters the esophagus, it is easily inserted down into the stomach. The tube must then be secured in place to prevent it from moving. There are several ways to secure an NG placement. One method and the least invasive is tape. Tape is positioned and wrapped around the NG tube onto the patients nose to prevent dislodgement.

Another securement device is a nasal bridle, or a device that enters one nare, around the nasal septum, and then to the other nare where it is secured in place around the nasogastric tube. There are two ways a bridle is put into place. One method, according to the Australian Journal of Otolaryngology, is performed by a physician to pull a material through the nares and then tied with the ends shortened to prevent removal of the tube. The other method is a device called the Applied Medical Technology, or AMT, bridle. This device uses a magnet inserted into both nares that connects at the nasal septum and then pulled through to one side and tied. This technology allows nurses to safely apply bridles. Several studies have proven the use of a nasal bridle prevents the loss of the NG placement that provides necessary nutrients or suctioning. A study conducted in the UK from 2014 through 2017, determined that 50% of feeding tubes secured with tape were lost inadvertently. The use of bridle securement decreased the percentage of NGs lost from 53% to 9%.

Great care must be taken to ensure that the tube has not passed through the larynx into the trachea and down into the bronchi. The reliable method is to aspirate some fluid from the tube with a syringe. This fluid is then tested with pH paper (note not litmus paper) to determine the acidity of the fluid. If the pH is 4 or below then the tube is in the correct position. If this is not possible then correct verification of tube position is obtained with an X-ray of the chest/abdomen. This is the most reliable means of ensuring proper placement of an NG tube. The use of a chest x-ray to confirm position is the expected standard in the UK, with physician review and confirmation. Future techniques may include measuring the concentration of enzymes such as trypsin, pepsin, and bilirubin to confirm the correct placement of the NG tube. As enzyme testing becomes more practical, allowing measurements to be taken quickly and cheaply at the bedside, this technique may be used in combination with pH testing as an effective, less harmful replacement of X-ray confirmation. Ultrasonography alone is not sufficient to confirm position for gastric tube. If the tube is to remain in place then a tube position check is recommended before each feed and at least once per day.

Only smaller diameter (12 Fr or less in adults) nasogastric tubes are appropriate for long-term feeding, so as to avoid irritation and erosion of the nasal mucosa. These tubes often have guidewires to facilitate insertion. If feeding is required for a longer period of time, other options, such as placement of a PEG tube, should be considered.

Function of an NG tube properly placed and used for suction is maintained by flushing. This may be done by flushing small amounts of saline and air using a syringe or by flushing larger amounts of saline or water, and air, and then assessing for the air to circulate through one lumen of the tube, into the stomach, and out the other lumen. When these two techniques of flushing were compared, the latter was more effective.

== Contraindications ==
The use of nasogastric intubation is contraindicated in patients with moderate-to-severe neck and facial fractures due to the increased risk of airway obstruction or improper tube placement. Special attention is necessary during insertion under these circumstances in order to avoid undue trauma to the esophagus. There is also a greater risk to patients with bleeding disorders, particularly those resulting from the distended sub-mucosal veins in the lower third of the esophagus known as esophageal varices which may be easily ruptured due to their friability and also in GERD (gastroesophageal reflux disease).

Alternative measures, such as an orogastric intubation, should be considered under these circumstances, or if the patient will be incapable of meeting their nutritional and caloric needs for an extended time period (usually >24 hours).

== Complications ==
Complications with nasogastric intubation can occur due to incorrect initial placement of the nasogastric tube or due to changes in tube position that go unrecognized. Nasogastric tubes mistakenly placed in the trachea or lungs can lead to aspiration of enteral feeds or medications administered through the NG tube. This can also lead to pneumothorax or pleural effusion, which often requires a chest tube to drain. Nasogastric tubes can also be mistakenly placed within the intracranial space; this is more likely to occur in patient who already have specific types of skull fractures.

Other complications include clogged or nonfunctional tubes, premature removal of the tube, erosion of the nasal mucosa, esophageal perforation esophageal reflux, nose bleeds, sinusitis, sore throat and gagging.

Fox News Digital reported about a voluntary field correction notice dated March 21, 2022, referenced 60 injuries and 23 deaths related to misplacement of a nasogastric tube. Avanos Medical's Cortrak2 EAS recall, has been classified as a Class I recall by the FDA, following these reports.

== See also ==
- Feeding tube
- Force feeding
