= Michel Fernex =

Swiss medical doctor (1929–2021)

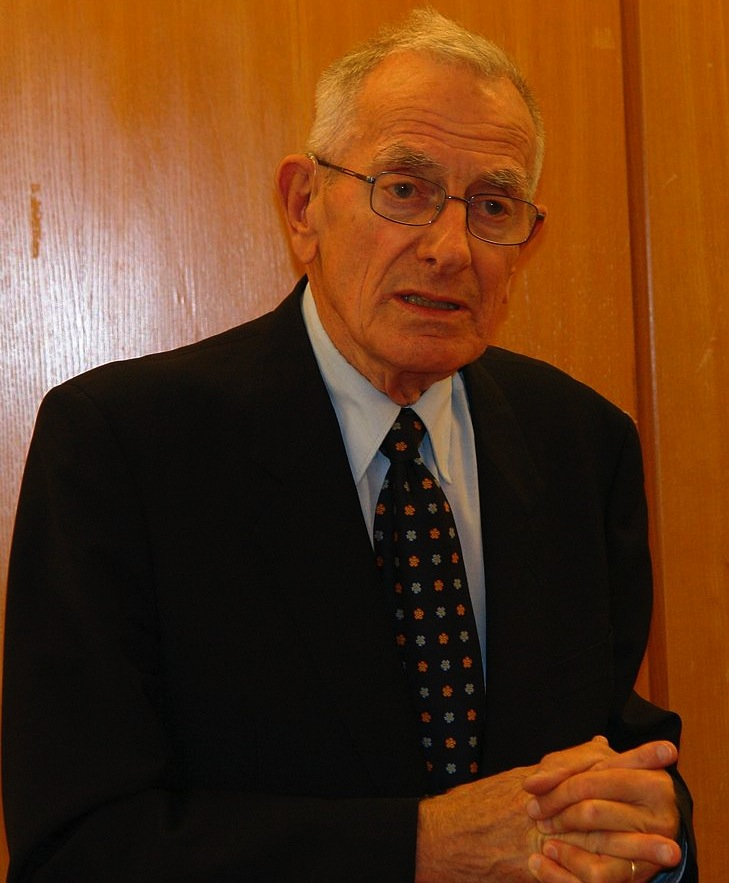
Fernex

Michel Fernex (2 April 1929 – 2 October 2021) was a Swiss medical doctor, from the Medical Faculty University of Basel. He was a member of Physicians for Social Responsibility and International Physicians for the Prevention of Nuclear War. He was a member of the Steering Committee on Tropical Diseases Research in the World Health Organization. He was also president of the organisation Children of Chernobyl Belarus. His wife, Solange Fernex, was also known as a prominent member of the Green Party.

He led a campaign for the independence of the WHO from the International Atomic Energy Agency.
