= Mustafa Koçak =

Turkish political prisoner (1991–2020)

- Born: July 25, 1991
- Died: April 24, 2020 (aged 28); İzmir, Turkey
- Cause of death: Complications due to starvation
- Resting place: Istanbul
- Occupation: Sandwich seller

Mustafa Koçak (July 25, 1991 – April 24, 2020) was a political prisoner arrested in Turkey on September 23, 2017. A court sentenced him to an aggravated life imprisonment for "violation of the Constitution" based on witness statements. He started a hunger strike for his right to a fair trial. Later on, he turned the hunger strike into a death fast. He died on day 279 weighing 29 kg (which is equal to 63 lbs) in İzmir Şakran Prison on April 24, 2020.

== Life and struggle ==
Mustafa was the son of a four-children working-class family. He spent his childhood and youth working in various jobs, from apprenticeships to a mobile breakfast clerk in order to contribute to his family. Koçak was arrested on September 23, 2017 and was sentenced to aggravated life imprisonment by the İstanbul 27th Heavy Penal Court on July 11, 2019.

Koçak was charged with supplying weapons to an illegal organization and was convicted of violating the Constitution. The court's decision on him stated the conclusion that he had committed the crime was "reached through a conscientious conviction". The only evidence against Mustafa was the witness statements of two police informants, Berk Ercan and Cavit Yilmaz. Cavit Yilmaz later fled to Germany and stated that he was forced to give a false testimony by the authorities.

Protests were carried out by his family in Istanbul on the streets, where they were arrested. There were also protests in Europe, in countries such as the United Kingdom and Germany.

On day 254 of his hunger strike, Mustafa Koçak was forcefully taken from his prison cell to a hospital to be force fed. Koçak was tied to a chair and was brought to Şakran Prison campus hospital around 4.30 p.m. on March 12. To his lawyer, Mustafa said that three doctors, including the chief physician of the campus hospital and an internal medicine specialist, forcibly intervened and he had been under torture for five days, he stated that he didn't accept forced intervention and despite that, they put on 73 bottles of drips. During visitation, he showed his arms; from his shoulders to wrists, there were needle marks and bruises stated his lawyer Ezgi Çakır.

== Death ==
Mustafa died on day 279 of his hunger strike, just a few hours before he died he had a phone call with his family. He stated "I cannot breathe, I can't turn around in my bed", he died at 3am on April 24, 2020. His body was taken from the prison in İzmir to Istanbul where he was buried on the same day.
