= George Rolph (activist) =

British activist (born 1953)

George Rolph (born 1953) is a British activist for disability rights and for male survivors of domestic violence.

== Personal life ==
Rolph has posttraumatic stress disorder (PTSD) as a result of seven years of abuse by two separate women. He lives in Bromley, South London in the United Kingdom.

== Domestic violence against men ==
Rolph's first campaign was about domestic violence against men. Rolph started a website (MAN2MAN), as an online forum where men who were survivors of abuse could meet to support each other and to discuss their feelings. He set up a helpline from his own home as a support mechanism in order to counsel those who were victims. He was also vice-chairman of Men's Aid. He was also National Domestic Violence Coordinator for the charity ManKind Initiative.

In October 2003, Rolph appeared on the BBC-1 talk show Kilroy, on a discussion titled Violent women which included contributions by Rolph and Sue Hoolahan of ManKind Initiative. Rolph was also interviewed on BBC Radio London on 10 February 2003 in a programme called "Inside Out" about his views on domestic violence against men. In November 2004 his experience as a male survivor of domestic violence was briefly discussed on the ITV talk show This Morning. In 2012, Rolph appeared in an interview on the television programme Inside Out, discussing the problem of abuse against men, and in July 2012 was interviewed on BBC News at One as the South East Regional Co-ordinator for the group ManKind Initiative, a charity which supports men suffering from domestic abuse.

== Atos ==
Rolph's second campaign was against Atos. On 20 May 2013, Rolph went on hunger strike against Atos and the Department for Work and Pensions who had taken away his disability benefits after an assessment. His hunger strike was in support of "the poor, the sick and disabled", and in protest against the UK coalition government's treatment of the disabled. His benefits were restored on day 7, after intervention from his local MP. However, Rolph said he would remain on hunger strike until the government made a commitment to abolish the use of ATOS to assess disabled people, and said that the assessments were humiliating, unfair and caused distress to vulnerable people. He was interviewed on BBC London News television on Wednesday 29 May 2013, nine days after he began his protest.

On 12 June 2013, the 23rd day of his hunger strike, the Daily Mirror published an article about George Rolph, which was the first time the mainstream press had reported on the campaign. In this interview, Rolph clarified the aims of his protest: Firstly, that people should keep their benefits while they appeal. Secondly, he wants an independent inquiry into Atos, the French company that carry out the Work Capability Assessments. On 12 June 2013, in a parliamentary debate about work capability assessment issues, Rolph's MP, Heidi Alexander, said his hunger strike was "an example of a disabled person who had no choice but to take such drastic action to bring to the Government's attention the failures of the system".

Rolph ended his hunger strike on 5 July 2013, the 46th day of his protest.
