= Jackie McMullan =

IRA Member (born 1955)

Jackie "Teapot" McMullan (born 1956) is a former volunteer in the Provisional Irish Republican Army (IRA) who took part in the 1981 Irish hunger strike.

== Background and IRA activity ==
McMullan was born in Belfast, Northern Ireland, in 1956, the third eldest of a family of seven children. He studied at a boarding school in Athlone in the Republic of Ireland before returning to Belfast in 1971. Following the introduction of internment in August 1971, McMullan's home was raided several times and, in September 1971, his older brother Michael was interned. Later that year McMullan joined the IRA's youth wing Fianna Éireann:

In my teens I was arrested maybe 20 times. Every male aged 13 to 65 would have been arrested, the vast majority for screening. And every single one of my friends joined the Fianna. We'd be scouting; you wouldn't have participated in firing guns or in ambushes. After school there were riots. The Brits, probably bored out of their skulls, used to drive down the Glen Road every day as schools were getting out.

In 1973, aged 17, McMullan joined the IRA's Belfast Brigade. In 1975 he acquired the nickname "Teapot" after the top of his ear was shot off during an attack on a British Army patrol. He was arrested in 1976 in possession of a revolver following a gun attack on a Royal Ulster Constabulary (RUC) base, and remanded to Crumlin Road Jail charged with attempting to murder RUC officers. At his trial in September 1976 he was convicted after forty minutes having refused to recognise the Diplock court; he received a life sentence and was sent to HM Prison Maze.

== Imprisonment ==
McMullan was the second person convicted after the withdrawal of Special Category Status for paramilitary prisoners, and he joined the blanket protest started by Kieran Nugent and refused to wear prison uniform. In 1978, after a number of attacks on prisoners leaving their cells to "slop out" (i.e., empty their chamber pots), the blanket protest escalated into the dirty protest, during which prisoners refused to wash and smeared the walls of their cells with excrement. As McMullan refused to wear a prison uniform he was not entitled to a monthly visit, and did not see his family until December 1979. McMullan described the visit in an interview:

The screws [prison officers] standing beside you, hating you, hating your relatives. Your eyes are bulging because you're locked in a cell 24 hours a day, you have matted hair, you're filthy, you look like a deranged maniac. You go out and try to act normal to your family, putting on a brave face, and so are they.

At his next visit, in March 1980, McMullan was expecting to see his mother Bernadette, but was instead visited by a priest who informed him of her death. During McMullan's imprisonment Bernadette had supported the protests and was involved in the Relatives' Action Committee, the predecessor to the National H-Block/Armagh Committee. In support of the protesting prisoners Bernadette took part in demonstrations across the country and abroad, and was part of a group of women who chained themselves to railings outside 10 Downing Street in London.

McMullan became the longest-serving protesting prisoner when Nugent was released in 1980, and later in the year the protest in the Maze escalated further and seven prisoners took part in a fifty-three-day hunger strike. The strike was aimed at restoring political prisoner status by securing what were known as the "Five Demands":

1. The right not to wear a prison uniform;
2. The right not to do prison work;
3. The right of free association with other prisoners, and to organise educational and recreational pursuits;
4. The right to one visit, one letter and one parcel per week;
5. Full restoration of remission lost through the protest.

The strike ended before any prisoners had died and without political status being secured, and a second hunger strike began on 1 March 1981 led by Bobby Sands, the IRA's Officer Commanding (OC) in the prison. McMullan joined the strike on 17 August, after Sands and eight other prisoners had starved themselves to death. Following the death of Michael Devine and the intervention of the families of several prisoners the hunger strike was called off on 3 October, the 48th day of McMullan's hunger strike. He later described his feelings about the end of the protest:

On the one hand I hadn't died but 10 of my friends had. It seemed at the time that we hadn't achieved our demands and that the protest was broke. But then we started to win the conditions outlined in the 5 Demands. A major escape [Maze Prison escape] was pulled off within two years.

During his time in prison, he studied with the Open University.

== Life after prison ==
McMullan was released in 1992, and initially struggled to re-adjust to life outside prison. Since that time he has worked for Sinn Féin and helped set up groups for former prisoners. In 2000, he helped organise the transfer of the IRA prisoners' library of books from the former HM Prison Maze to Belfast's Linen Hall Library, with a view to setting up a lending library for former prisoners. McMullan has since worked as a political education officer for Coiste na n-Iarchimí, an umbrella organisation for Republican ex-prisoners groups, and, as of March 2007, he was working as a special advisor to Sinn Féin's Minister for Education Caitríona Ruane.
