= Tom McFeely =

Irish property developer

Tom McFeely (born 1949) is an Irish property developer and former member of the Provisional Irish Republican Army. Originally from Dungiven area in County Londonderry, Northern Ireland, McFeely was drawn into the violence that signalled the beginning of the Troubles in 1969 and would soon become a member of the Provisional IRA. Following a period of living life on the run, McFeely was captured and imprisoned after he and an accomplice robbed a post office in the mid-1970s. McFeely was sent to HM Prison Maze where he took on a leadership role amongst other imprisoned IRA men. In 1980 McFeely led seven IRA men on a hunger strike in protest against the revoking of special status for political prisoners, ultimately surviving for 53 days without food until the strike was called off by IRA leadership. In 1986 McFeely was amongst a number of Irish republicans who split from the Provisional IRA and Sinn Féin over their recognition of the legitimacy of Dáil Éireann. He subsequently founded the League of Communist Republicans alongside fellow inmate Tommy McKearney.

In 1989 McFeely successfully appealed his case and was released from prison. He thereafter moved to Dublin and entered the construction industry, just as a building boom began as part of Ireland's Celtic Tiger era. Accumulating significant wealth in the 1990s, by the 2000s McFeely was the subject of several criminal investigations. Those investigations found that McFeely had avoided paying millions of euros in taxes and that his property companies had built substandard housing across Ireland. By the early 2010s, McFeely had been declared bankrupt in multiple countries. As of 2023, McFeely continues to work in the construction sector in Ireland and Northern Ireland. A 2022 article in the Irish Times described McFeely as "arguably the most disastrous developer to have operated in Ireland over recent decades".

== Early life ==
Thomas Bernard McFeely was born in the village of Farkland, near Dungiven in County Londonderry, Northern Ireland in 1949. He was one of 13 siblings to Catholic parents. His grandfather served in the British army during World War I while his uncle was a British marine who was killed in action. McFeely has described his grandmother and mother as militantly anti-British following the death of his uncle. McFeely's father was a cattle trader with Irish nationalist views.

McFeely was educated in Derry until the age of 14, at which point he began simultaneously working for his father and working on construction sites. One of McFeely's first encounters with Irish Republicanism was during the 1966 United Kingdom general election in Northern Ireland, in which he voted for the republican Neil Gillespie instead of the Nationalist Party candidate Paddy Gormley in the Londonderry constituency.

In 1968 McFeely briefly relocated to England before returning to Northern Ireland at the outset of the Northern Ireland civil rights movement. McFeely has claimed to have been involved in riots that occurred in that period such as the Battle of the Bogside. It was during this period that McFeely heard speeches by political activists such as Bernadette Devlin and Eamonn McCann and became intrigued by their socialist stances.

== Membership of the Provisional IRA ==
By the early 1970s, McFeely was actively involved in the Provisional IRA, which lead to his arrest and sentencing to six months of jail time. Instead, McFeely went on the lamb and fled over the border to the Republic of Ireland. He soon returned to Northern Ireland, moving his wife and children to County Antrim, where he soon set out to bomb the local dole office. However, McFeely was caught in the act by members of the Royal Ulster Constabulary. In 1974 McFeely fled once again to the Republic, however this time he was subsequently caught in County Leitrim and imprisoned on a charge of illegally possessing firearms. In August 1974 McFeely and 18 other republicans escaped from Portlaoise prison when they used gelignite to blow a hole in the perimeter wall.

== Imprisonment ==
In the mid-1970s McFeely was involved in the robbery of a post office in Northern Ireland; following the robbery McFeely and his accomplice, another member of the IRA, were pursued to a rural house by the RUC. The authorities lay siege to the house and during the course of events, McFeely shot (but did not kill) a member of the RUC. Eventually, McFeely and the other man surrendered and were arrested. McFeely was charged and found guilty of attempted murder, possession of weapons and the robbery of the post office, and sentenced to 26 years in prison in 1977. The presiding judge described McFeely as "an extremely dangerous, intelligent and vicious young man".

=== Involvement in 1980 Irish hunger strikes ===
Following a decision by the British state to no longer recognise IRA prisoners as "political prisoners" with special status within prisons, McFeely was amongst seven IRA men who went on hunger strike in 1980 in protest. Over the course of the strike, McFeely went without food for 53 days. McFeely and the rest ended their strike when it appeared to the IRA that they had successfully brokered an official deal with the British government. However, this deal was never actually secured. McFeely, who had opposed the original order to end the strike, was infuriated that no deal was ever actually officially struck. Nevertheless, during the 1981 hunger strikes, McFeely once again offered to strike, but this was rejected by the IRA leadership.

=== Split from Provisional IRA and Sinn Féin ===
In 1986, Sinn Féin voted to recognise the legitimacy of Dáil Éireann and stand candidates for election in the Republic of Ireland. This caused a number of splits in both Sinn Féin and the Provisional IRA, creating groups such as Republican Sinn Féin and the Continuity IRA. Concurrently, a number of IRA men imprisoned in Long Kesh also split from the Provisional IRA. Amongst them were McFeely and Tommy McKearney, who subsequently formed a new group called the League of Communist Republicans.

== Property developer ==
Following a successful appeal of his case, McFeely was released from prison in 1989 and moved to Dublin, where he took up work once again on construction sites. McFeely's return to construction coincided with the beginnings of a building boom as part of the Celtic Tiger in the Republic of Ireland, and within a few years, McFeely had gone from almost penniless and homeless to being wealthy enough to purchase a pub in his hometown of Dungiven.

By the mid-2000s, McFeely had become a major property developer in Ireland but was dogged by allegations of misconduct. In 2006 McFeely was the subject of a major investigation by the Criminal Assets Bureau, which found that McFeely owed the Irish state €8,000,000 in unpaid taxes. That same year Offaly County Council took McFeely's Coalport building company to the High Court after an 88-unit housing estate near Portarlington built by the company was left in "appalling condition".

The following year, in 2007, McFeely's construction company, Coalport, was involved in eight major cases brought before the High Court. McFeely took out a €10,000,000 loan with his primary home as collateral in order to fight all the cases but soon thereafter stopped paying the mortgage. In 2009 McFeely was ordered to repay $6,200,000 in outstanding loans he owed to a bank and €580,000 that he owed to the Irish state. It was also in 2009 that 28 tenants in an apartment building in Dundalk, County Louth were told to leave as Louth County Council closed the building due to fire safety concerns.

In 2011, the 300 residents of Priory Hall, a complex of 187 apartments in Dublin built by McFeely's companies, were ordered by the High Court to evacuate after an investigation found the entire development to be an immediate fire risk. It subsequently cost the Irish state "tens of millions" of Euro to remedy this.

In the Spring of 2012, McFeely was placed in bankruptcy in the Republic of Ireland. Soon thereafter he was also declared bankrupt in England. McFeely's Dublin home, which had once served as the German embassy in Ireland, had at one point been worth €15,000,000 but was sold for €3,000,000 later that same year.

In October 2013, a plumber working at the Dublin home of McFeely discovered €140,000 in cash hidden underneath a bath and reported this to the authorities. Once notified, the Criminal Assets Bureau raided the home and found an additional €60,000 in cash kept at the location. McFeely initially denied any knowledge of the cash and suggested that it had been planted there as part of a conspiracy. Following the incident, Taoiseach Enda Kenny derided McFeely as exhibiting the negative excesses of the Celtic Tiger era.

In the early 2020s, Sinn Féin's spokesperson on housing Eoin O'Broin repeatedly criticised McFeely. O'Broin's 2021 book Defects: Living with the Legacy of the Celtic Tiger was highly critical of McFeely's role in the Priory Hall development. O'Broin continued to criticise McFeely in newspaper articles in 2022 and 2023.

== Politics ==
McFeely identifies as a "Socialist Republican". Since 1986, McFeely has held views critical of Sinn Féin. In 2004, McFeely alongside other business leaders attended a meeting with Mary Lou McDonald. McFeely described the event as "There was a 'come-for-wine-and-canapes-and-meet-Mary-Lou thing' for business people at a Smithfield hotel. I went along. It was unrecognisable from anything I fought for. I looked around the room. It was many things, but it wasn't republican". In a 2009 interview McFeely stated that "[In the 1980s] I argued with other prisoners who were pleased at Sinn Féin taking votes off the SDLP. I told them Sinn Féin, not the SDLP, would destroy the IRA, and I was right. The leadership were intent on a deal far short of a British withdrawal and a united Ireland. It was immoral to continue armed struggle in such circumstances.". In the same 2009 interview McFeely was described as hating Fianna Fáil, with his feelings about Bertie Ahern being called "unprintable" by the interviewing journalist.

McFeely is a reader of the works of Vladimir Lenin and keeps large collections of Lenin's books in his home.

In October 2011 Enda Kenny, during a session of the Dáil discussing Priory Hall, accused Sinn Féin leader Gerry Adams of being an "acquaintance" of McFeely's, something Adams immediately denied and stated that Kenny was engaging in defamation by making such a claim.
