= League of Communist Republicans =

- Abbreviation: LCR
- Founders: Tommy McKearney; Tom McFeely
- Founded: c. 1986
- Dissolved: c. 1991
- Split from: Sinn Féin; Provisional IRA
- Headquarters: HM Prison Maze
- Newspaper: Congress
- Ideology: Marxist-Leninism; Vanguardism; Irish republicanism
- Political position: Far-left
- Colours: Red

The League of Communist Republicans (LCR) was a Marxist-Leninist and Irish republican micro-organisation that split from Sinn Féin and the Provisional IRA in 1986. The league was almost exclusively made up of republican prisoners in HM Prison Maze (known also as "Long Kesh") and their families; In total the membership was approximately 25 to 30 prisoners and a similar number of family members. Founding members included Tommy McKearney, Tom McFeely, James Tierney, Eugene Bryne and Oliver Corr.

The league broke away from the Sinn Féin/the PIRA for a number of reasons, such as the vote at the 1986 Sinn Féin Ardfheis to recognise the legitimacy of Dáil Éireann and to stand in elections in the Republic of Ireland. The league had also come to reject the Armalite and ballot box strategy and believed that the Provisional IRA needed to either return to a "ground war" against the British state or cease fighting altogether, rather than its strategy at that time of seldom but spectacular attacks. The members of the League believed that the "spectacular" attacks were too often botched, and too often resulted in the deaths of IRA members. Tommy McKearney's brother Pádraig McKearney was killed during one such "spectacular" attack, during the Loughgall ambush in May 1987.

The league, as a Marxist-Leninist organisation, rejected electoralism and instead called for mass struggle against the British. However, it also made clear this mass struggle must be led by a Vanguard party.

Initially tolerated by the Provisional IRA, eventually, a command was given to PIRA prisoners to resist the League within HM Prison Maze. This would lead to all members of the League being moved to HM Prison Maghaberry.

The league had little influence outside of HM Prison Maze, but it did produce a monthly newspaper called Congress, which was named after the Republican Congress. A typical issue of Congress would consist of 2/3s discussion of political theory (primarily written by Tommy McKearney under a pseudonym) and 1/3 discussion of ongoing world affairs. Particularly towards the end of the 1980s, the world affairs portion would focus on the Soviet Union.

Both Congress and the League collapsed in concert with the collapse of the Soviet Union, as occurred to many other communist parties globally in that era. The final issue of Congress was published in the winter of 1991. Congress had supported the reforms of Mikhail Gorbachev in the hope they would rejuvenate socialism in the Soviet Union; the failure of these reforms to prevent the Soviet Union from collapsing left the credibility of its analysis shattered.
