= King's Hall, Belfast =

Venue in south Belfast

King's Hall
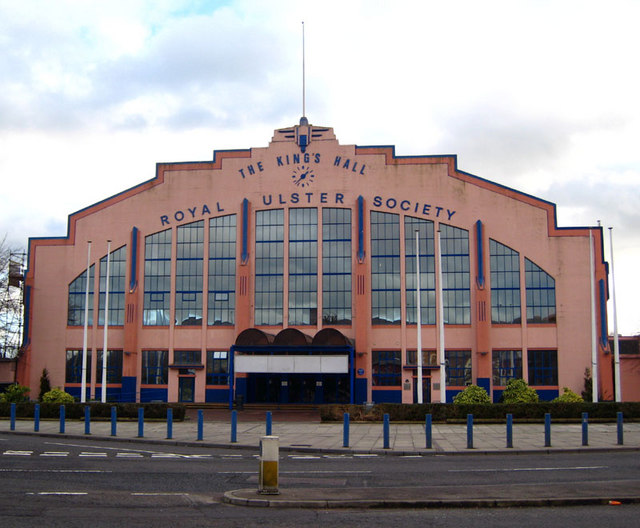
- Exterior of main venue (c.2008)
- Interactive map of King's Hall
- Former names: King's Hall Exhibition and Conference Centre (1934–2008)
- Address: Lisburn Road; Belfast BT9 6GW; Northern Ireland
- Location: Balmoral
- Coordinates: 54.567°N 5.967°W
- Owner: Royal Ulster Agricultural Society

Construction
- Built: 1896
- Opened: 30 June 1896
- Closed: 30 June 2012

The King's Hall was a multi-purpose venue located in Belfast, Northern Ireland. The King's Hall consisted of 6 event venues. The King's Hall is owned by the Royal Ulster Agricultural Society (RUAS) (previously the North East Agricultural Association of Ireland), who moved to the venue in 1896 from their previous showgrounds in Belfast Corporation Markets area. The RUAS moved out in 2012 and the venue was being re-developed as of 2021.

== History ==
In 1891, the North East Agricultural Association of Ireland appealed to its members and the general public for funds to purchase new premises as they had outgrown the site at Belfast Corporation Markets. Suitable land sites were considered at Bloomfield, Fortwilliam Park, Andersonstown, Turf Lodge, Ulsterville, Castlereagh Road, Ballymacarret, Ormeau Road and Antrim Road. However the most favoured was the land at Balmoral. Agreement to purchase the 32-acre (130,000 m^{2}) Balmoral site was made in 1894. Work on the site began in 1896 and was finished for the opening of the first Balmoral Show on 30 June 1896.

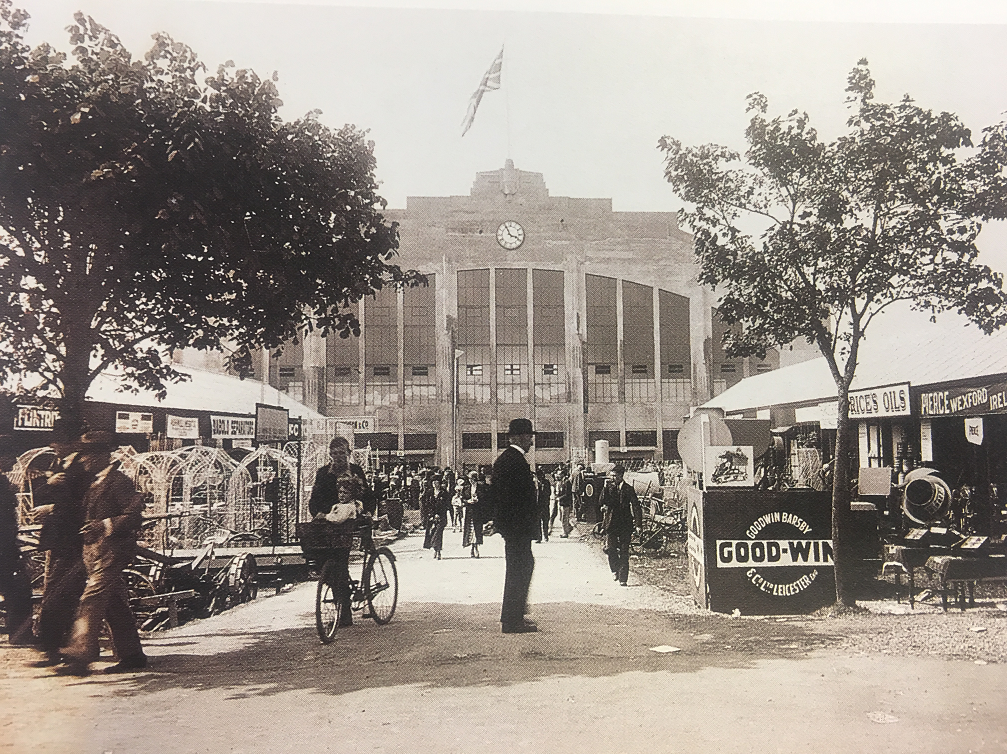
The King's Hall building

The King's Hall was designed by Leitch and Partners, Glasgow, built in 1933 by J & R Thompson, Belfast and opened by the Duke of Gloucester on 29 May 1934. The King's Hall was the largest exhibition venue in Northern Ireland and prior to the completion of the Odyssey and the Waterfront Hall, was the only large concert venue in Northern Ireland. It hosted the Balmoral Show, an annual agricultural show with regular attendees in excess of 75,000. The stepped facade of the hall features substantial windows and Art Deco motifs on doors and buttresses. Inside, the functional space is spanned by reinforced concrete arches.

When Ireland hosted the 2003 Special Olympics World Summer Games, the roller skating event was held at King's Hall.

The main hall was also a famous boxing venue. Rinty Monaghan boxed several times in the hall. A blue plaque was unveiled in his memory at the hall in 2007. In 1985 Barry McGuigan made his first title defence against Bernard Taylor at the King's Hall, having fought there on six previous occasions. Both boxers have become synonymous with the venue. Other famous bouts to have taken place in the hall include Ray Close's rematch with Chris Eubank in 1994, and Dave McAuley's two fights with Fidel Bassa in 1987 and 1988.

Other high-profile boxers to have fought at the venue include: Tyson Fury, Jamie Moore, John Duddy, Martin Lindsay, Neil Sinclair, Robin Reid, Wayne McCullough, Danny Williams, Amir Khan, Paul McCloskey, Eamonn Magee and Brian Magee.

In June 2012, the RUAS voted to purchase and develop a new venue, Balmoral Park, a 65-acre (260,000 m^{2}) events park located in Lisburn, around 10 miles (16 km) from the current King's Hall site. Also at this time, the RUAS unveiled plans to build Northern Ireland's largest exhibition and events venue at Balmoral Park to replace the main King's Hall building. This venue was constructed in 2015 and named the Eikon Exhibition Centre. As a result, the King's Hall building closed its doors on 30 June 2012.

As of 2021, the King's Hall was in the process of being re-developed into a health and wellbeing park.
