= Dirty protest =

Part of a five-year protest during the Troubles

A prison cell during the dirty protest

The dirty protest (also called the no wash protest) was part of a five-year protest during the Troubles by Provisional Irish Republican Army (IRA) and Irish National Liberation Army (INLA) prisoners held in the Maze Prison (also known as "Long Kesh") and a protest at Armagh Women's Prison in Northern Ireland. In March 1978 some prisoners refused to leave their cells to shower or use the lavatory because of attacks by prison officers, and the inmates would later start smearing excrement on the walls of their cells.

== Background ==
Convicted paramilitary prisoners were treated as ordinary criminals until July 1972, when Special Category Status was introduced following a hunger strike by 40 IRA prisoners led by the veteran republican Billy McKee. Special Category (or political) status meant prisoners were treated very much like prisoners of war, for example, not having to wear prison uniforms or do prison work. In 1976, as part of the policy of "criminalisation", the British government brought an end to Special Category Status for paramilitary prisoners in Northern Ireland. The policy was not introduced for existing prisoners, but for those convicted after 1 March 1976.

The end to Special Category Status was a serious threat to the authority which the paramilitary leaderships inside prison had been able to exercise over their own men, as well as being a propaganda blow. The imminent withdrawal of Special Category Status caused relations between the prisoners and prison officers to deteriorate, and in early 1976 the IRA leaders in prison sent word to the IRA Army Council asking them to assassinate prison officers, stating "We are prepared to die for political status. Those who try to take it away from us must be fully prepared to pay the same price". Outside the prison the IRA responded by shooting prison officer Patrick Dillon in April 1976, the first of nineteen prison officers to be killed during the five-year protest. On 14 September 1976 newly convicted prisoner Kieran Nugent began the blanket protest, in which IRA and INLA prisoners refused to wear prison uniform and either went naked or fashioned garments from prison blankets.

== Dirty protest ==
In March 1978 some prisoners refused to leave their cells to shower or use the lavatory because of attacks by prison officers, and were provided with wash-hand basins in their cells. The prisoners requested showers installed in their cells, and when this request was turned down they refused to use the wash-hand basins. At the end of April 1978 a fight occurred between a prisoner and a prison officer in H-Block 6. The prisoner was taken away to solitary confinement, and news spread across the wing that the prisoner had been badly beaten.

The prisoners responded by smashing the furniture in their cells, and the prison authorities responded by removing the remaining furniture from the cells, leaving the prisoners in cells with just blankets and mattresses. The prisoners responded by refusing to leave their cells, and as a result the prison officers were unable to clear them. This resulted in the blanket protest escalating into the dirty protest, as the prisoners could not leave their cells to "slop out" (i.e., empty their chamber pots), and smeared excrement on the walls of their cells. Prisoner Pat McGeown described the conditions inside the prison in a 1985 interview:

There were times when you would vomit. There were times when you were so run down that you would lie for days and not do anything with the maggots crawling all over you. The rain would be coming in the window and you would be lying there with the maggots all over the place.

The prison authorities attempted to keep the cells clean by breaking the cell windows and spraying in disinfectant, then temporarily removing the prisoners and sending in rubber-suited prison officers with steam hoses to clean the walls. However, as soon as the prisoners were returned to their cells they resumed their protest. By mid-1978 there were between 250 and 300 protesting prisoners, and the protest was attracting media attention from around the world. Tomás Ó Fiaich, the Roman Catholic Cardinal Archbishop of Armagh, visited the prison on 31 July 1978 and condemned the conditions there:

Having spent the whole of Sunday in the prison, I was shocked at the inhuman conditions prevailing in H-Blocks, three, four and five, where over 300 prisoners were incarcerated. One would hardly allow an animal to remain in such conditions, let alone a human being. The nearest approach to it that I have seen was the spectacle of hundreds of homeless people living in the sewer pipes in the slums of Calcutta. The stench and filth in some of the cells, with the remains of rotten food and human excreta scattered around the walls was almost unbearable. In two of them I was unable to speak for fear of vomiting.

Despite the conditions, Ó Fiaich said the morale of the prisoners was high:

From talking to them [he wrote] it is evident that they intend to continue their protest indefinitely and it seems they prefer to face death rather than to submit to being classed as criminals. Anyone with the least knowledge of Irish history knows how deeply this attitude is in our country's past. In isolation and perpetual boredom they maintain their sanity by studying Irish. It was an indication of the triumph of the human spirit over adverse material conditions to notice Irish words, phrases and songs being shouted from cell to cell and then written on each cell wall with the remnants of toothpaste tubes.

The protest continued with no sign of compromise from the British government, and by late 1979 nine out of ten newly arriving prisoners were choosing to join the protest. In January 1980 the prisoners issued a statement outlining what were known as the "Five Demands":

1. The right not to wear a prison uniform;
2. The right not to do prison work;
3. The right of free association with other prisoners, and to organise educational and recreational pursuits;
4. The right to one visit, one letter and one parcel per week;
5. Full restoration of remission lost through the protest.

In February 1980, Mairéad Farrell and over thirty other prisoners in Armagh Women's Prison joined the dirty protest following a series of disputes with the prison governor, including allegations they had been ill-treated by male prison officers. They did not conduct a blanket protest, as women prisoners in Northern Ireland retained the right to wear their own clothes, but did smear feces and menstrual blood on their cell walls.

In June 1980 the British government's position was strengthened when the European Commission of Human Rights rejected a case by four prisoners, including Kieran Nugent, that conditions inside the prison were "inhuman". The Commission's ruling was that the conditions were self-inflicted and "designed to enlist sympathy for the [prisoners'] political aims".

== Hunger strikes ==
On 27 October 1980, IRA members Brendan Hughes, Tommy McKearney, Raymond McCartney, Tom McFeeley, Sean McKenna, Leo Green, and INLA member John Nixon, began a hunger strike aimed at restoring political status for paramilitary prisoners by securing the "Five Demands". After a 53-day hunger strike with McKenna lapsing in and out of a coma and on the brink of death, the government appeared to concede the essence of the prisoners' five demands with a 30-page document detailing a proposed settlement. With the document in transit to Belfast, Hughes took the decision to save McKenna's life and end the strike after 53 days on 18 December.

By January 1981, the prisoners' demands had still not been met. On 4 February, the prisoners issued a statement saying that the British government had failed to resolve the crisis and declared their intention of "hunger striking once more". The 1981 Irish hunger strike began on 1 March when Bobby Sands refused food, and the dirty protest ended the following day. By the time the hunger strike ended on 3 October, ten men, including Sands, had starved to death. Two days later, the incoming Northern Ireland Secretary, Jim Prior, announced a number of changes in prison policy, including that from then on all paramilitary prisoners would be allowed to wear their own clothes at all times.

== See also ==
- Armagh Prison Dirty Protest
