= Armagh Prison no-wash protest =

1980–81 protest in Northern Ireland

The 1980 - 1981 Armagh Prison no-wash protest occurred in Armagh Prison in Northern Ireland during the Troubles. Organised by republican women, prisoners refused to bathe, use the lavatory, empty chamber pots, or clean their cells. This coincided with the no-wash protest orchestrated by male prisoners at Maze and Long Kesh Prison. Their protests differed because the women in Armagh Prison also smeared their menstrual blood against the cell walls. The women's gender and the harsh treatment they endured at the hands of male prison officers drew attention to the protest from feminist and republican groups.

== Background ==
=== Female prisoners in Armagh Prison ===
Armagh Prison was the only female prison in Northern Ireland during the Troubles (although it also held male prisoners in separate wings). From 1971 to 1986, the majortiy of its female prisoners belonged to political groups. Most of these prisoners were members of republican groups such as the IRA, but there were loyalist women imprisoned there too.

One account has described the prison's cell as measuring nine feet by six; another account described them as eight feet by ten. Between 1971 and 1986, each cell was shared by two prisoners. The prison consisted of the A wing, the B wing and the C wing, which was constructed for the specific purpose of holding political prisoners. The conditions in this C wing have been compared to the conditions in Maze and Long Kesh's H-Blocks.

=== Special category status ===
Since a hunger strike of 40 IRA prisoners in 1972, prisoners convicted as members of the IRA had been given Special Category Status by the British government. The Special Category Status, which classified them as political prisoners rather than as members of the general prison population, entitled them to certain privileges.

In 1976, the British government revoked special category status. Prisoners in Armagh Prison lost many of their rights, including visitation, remission and recreation allowances. They were put into solitary confinement for 23 hours a day, and prisoners had their rosary beads and prayer books confiscated.

== The no-wash protest ==
The no-wash protest in Armagh Prison began on the afternoon of 7 February 1980 after a search was conducted of the women's cells. The prison offers were reportedly searching for clothing that were used in the commemorative marches staged in the prison yard, including black berets and clothing items that bore the symbol of the Easter lily. This search escalated into the officers beating the women. For the next 24 hours, they were confined to their cells and not allowed to use toilet facilities. This event has been called Black February. The women refused to use toilet facilities after this, beginning the no-wash protest.

Participants in the no-wash protest smeared the walls of their cells with urine and faces. They also refused to change their clothes or clean their bodies, teeth and hair. Mairéad Farrell wrote that they intentionally covered the walls in excrament because the cells would gain an "unbearable" foul smell if it sat on the floor. Síle Darragh described that although they eventually became used to spreading excrament across the walls, it initially made them all vomit. To prevent the women from emptying their chamberpots out of the cell windows, the windows were boarded up, leaving the women in darkness.

One difference between the no-wash protest at Armagh Prison and Maze and Long Kesh was that the female prisoners in Armagh Prison had menstrual blood, which they also smeared on the walls. Professor Azrini Wahidin argued that the reason journalist Tim Pat Coogan reported that the no-wash protest was a more nauseating sensory experience in Armagh Prison than in Maze and Long Kesh was because of the utilisation of menstrual blood there.

Every three months, the prisoners were moved to new, clean cells. Prison officers wore masks and insulating suits to shield them from the cells' dirt, and they used steam-cleaning equipment sent from Maze and Long Kesh. One visitor to the prison described the staff's reaction to the protest: "To the female staff it was beyond understanding. The men certainly didn't to clean up the mess."

The no-wash protest had an impact on the participants' health: infection rates peaked in the prison during this time. Participating prisoners experienced "eye infections, scabies and dermatitis, bleeding gums, cystitits, diarrhoea, and weight and hair loss." According to Margaretta D'Arcy, many women caught vaginal infections. Prisoners were reportedly only given two sanitary towels a day in Armagh Prison. They have also alleged that they were refused medical attention as punishment for the protest. The health impacts lead multiple women to abandon to the protest.

Cameras and film were smuggled in and out Armagh Prison. The photographs taken were not only a means of defying the British prison system but also revealed the true state of the prisoner's cells during the no-wash protest. These photographs were reprinted in community publications and likely passed onto the prisoners' family members. One photograph of Farrell standing in her cell was used as the cover image of D'Arcy's book Tell Them Everything, which was published in 1981. Upon Farrell's death, the same image was printed on the front page of The Times.

The women of Armagh Prison also engaged in other forms of protest. A no-work protest was in place prior to the no-wash protest. The no-work protest has not been perceived as having made significant impact. Three women in Armagh Prison also took part in the 1980 hunger strike. The strike officially began on 27 October and the three women—Mairéad Farrell, Mary Doyle and Mairéad Nugent—joined on 1 December. When prison officers told the three women that Brendan Hughes had called off the strike on 18 December 1980, the women waited until they received official confirmation of this from republican leadership before they ended their hunger strike. When the second hunger strike began on 1 March 1891, they did not join it as they were still recovering from the first strike.

== Reactions to the protest ==
The Armagh Prison no-wash protest went widely unacknowledged until The Irish Times published an article by Nell McCafferty in August 1990. In this article, McCafferty wrote, "The menstrual blood on the walls of Armagh prison smells to high heaven. Shall we turn our noses up?"

=== In Britain ===
In Britain, the broad reaction to the no-wash protests was unsympathetic. The British National Union of Students voted that the prisoners should not have special category status returned to them but they also voted to create a campaign "against the inhuman treatment of women prisoners in Armagh jail". The Labour Party also expressed worry about the cruel treatment enacted by the male officers in Armagh Prison and the withholding of medical and sanitary materials.

=== By feminist groups ===
Feminist groups were conflicted over the protests in Armagh Prison. The group Women Against Imperialism viewed the violence inflicted upon the women as a product of patriarchy, and some interpreted the no-wash protest as a demonstration against sexual assault. The coal support of Women Against Imperialism—particularly the protests they held outside of the prison on International Women's Day—brought international publicity and support to the movement.

The interpretation that the no-wash protest was a feminist issue was supported by the protestors themselves: in a letter smuggled out from the prison, one woman wrote, "It is a feminist issue in so far as we are women, even though we are treated as criminals. It is a feminist issue when the network of this jail is completely geared to male domination."

=== By republican groups ===
Initially, IRA and Sinn Féin leaders did not support the Armagh Prison no-wash protest because they worried it would divert attention away from the no-wash protest occurring in Maze and Long Kesh. Furthermore, many disapproved of the women engaging in the no-wash protest because it conflicted with the standard image of a traditional woman.

Support given by the IRA and other Irish republicans was often portrayed in a sexist, male-centered way, from describing the protesting women as "very pretty" and "stylish" to depicting their actions as forced upon them, with the women as victims, rather than as an act of free will and rabid determinism. In addition, the constant referral to the protesters as "girls" rather than "women" diminished their portrayed power within both the protest and the movement; rather than being autonomous adults, they were being depicted as small children, not only asexual, but without a powerful will. Republican media portrayed the women as victims of the British prison system; this contrasted with their portrayal of male prisoners in Maze and Long Kesh as courageous and righteous.

There is evidence that the women in Armagh Prison viewed their no-wash protest as a means of republican resistance. For instance, they aligned themselves to the women of Cumin na mBan, promoted the education of Gaelic, and organised themselves under a "paramility-style hierarchy".

== Aftermath and legacy ==
The no-wash protest ended on 1 May 1981, at the request of the IRA and Sinn Féin leadership. Simultaneously, the hunger strike led by Bobby Sands began. It was hoped that calling off the broader protests would allow attention to be focused on this new strike.

Special category status for prisoners with political motivations was never reinstated. In 1986, Armagh Prison closed and all prisoners were moved to Maghaberry Prison.

The Armagh no-wash protest has been highlighted as a key event that facilitated the full inclusion of women into the republican movement from 1980 onwards. For example, Sinn Féin made it mandatory that one-quarter of its high council should consist of women.

=== Representations in media ===
The Armagh Prison no-wash protest was dramatised in Irish filmmaker Maeve Murphy's debut feature film Silent Grace. It was nominated for the Conflict and Resolution Award at the Hamptons International Film Festival USA, and the UK selector picked it for Cannes' Un Certain Regard; it was only after the film's screening there that it was realised that it was an Irish—not British—film. Although BBC film reviewer Jamie Russell criticised the film's characterisation and direction, he also stated that Murphy deserved praise for "alerting us to the way in which the contribution of female political prisoners to the Republican struggle has been marginalised in the Irish history books". In 2016, Emilie Pine, writing for the Irish Times, criticised the male centric media representations of the Troubles and highlighted Silent Grace as an outlying film that considered the female experience of the era.

The 2008 film Hunger by Steve McQueen has been criticised for making no reference to the female contributions to the protests that the film is centred around, including the Armagh Prison no-wash protest. The same argument was levlled at the documentary Bobby Sands: 66 Days. Furthermore, scholars have drawn comparison between Hunger's valorisation of Bobby Sands' blood and the real-life disgust that the Armagh women's menstrual blood was viewed with. Scull argued. "[W]e are asked to look at Sands' blood as visceral evidence of his masculine struggle", whereas "the actual blood of menstruation from the women's bodies of the Armagh Prison Dirty Protest is still to abject to be screened."
