= Tommy McKearney =

Irish activist and journalist (born 1952)

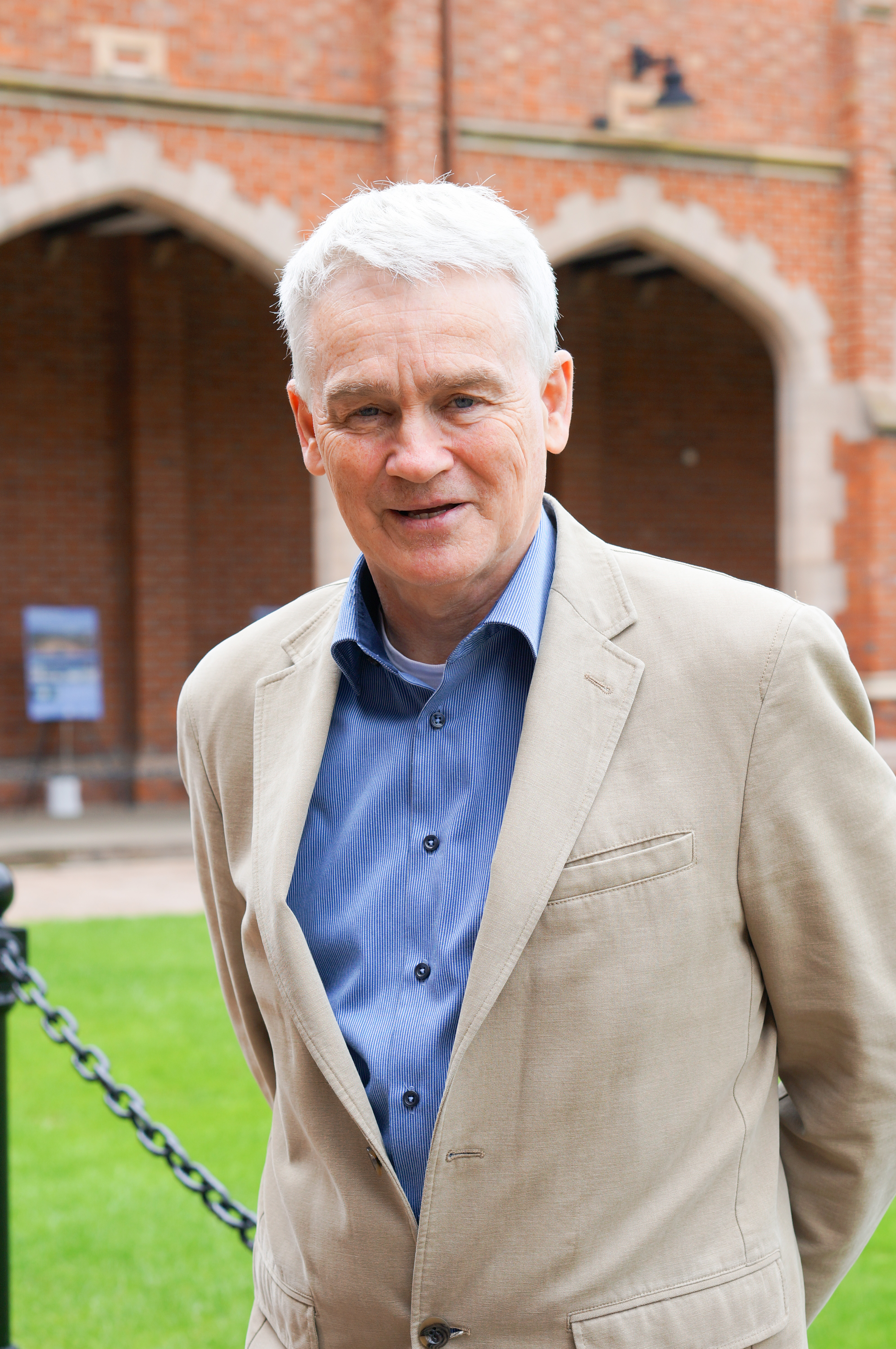
McKearney, pictured at The Queen's University of Belfast in 2014

Tommy McKearney (born 1952) is a former Irish volunteer in the Provisional Irish Republican Army who took part in the 1980 hunger strike.

== Background ==
McKearney was born in Lurgan in the north-east of County Armagh, but he was raised in The Moy, a village in the south-east of County Tyrone, just across the River Blackwater from County Armagh. He was born into a family with a long tradition of Irish republicanism. Both his grandfathers had fought in the Irish Republican Army in the Irish War of Independence, his maternal grandfather Tom Murray being an Adjutant General in the North Roscommon Brigade.

McKearney lost three of his brothers during the Northern Ireland Troubles. Sean was killed by his own bomb in 1974, Pádraig was killed by the Special Air Service (SAS) in the Loughgall Ambush on 8 May 1987, and Kevin, a non-paramilitary, was murdered by the Ulster Volunteer Force (UVF) in 1992 while working in the family's butcher shop. His sister, Margaret, was the subject of an unsuccessful extradition attempt in 1975, when Scotland Yard described her as "possibly the most dangerous woman terrorist in Britain."

== IRA activity ==
On 9 August 1971, the day internment was introduced, McKearney received his A-level results. He had hoped to study at Queen's University Belfast and become a teacher but his results were not good enough to secure entry. He describes the introduction of internment as "the straw that broke the camel's back" and decided to join the Provisional IRA, becoming a member of the East Tyrone Brigade. He became the brigade's OC during the mid-seventies. On 19 October 1977 he was arrested and charged with the murder of Stanley Adams, a postman and part-time Ulster Defence Regiment (UDR) lance corporal (L/Cpl) of the 8th Battalion. He was interrogated for seven days under the Prevention of Terrorism Act, and says he was ill-treated while in custody. He later received a life sentence with a recommended minimum term of twenty years for the murder of L/Cpl Adams, after a statement which he never signed was accepted by the court on the word of a Royal Ulster Constabulary (RUC) Inspector.

=== Hunger strike ===
McKearney was involved in the blanket and dirty protests, and took part in the 1980 hunger strike along with other IRA members. Prior to commencing the hunger strike, McKearney told his mother and father:

I'll put all my cards on the table. I'm going on hunger strike. If and when I die, I want to be brought back to Roscommon and be buried alongside my Granda (grandfather) . . . Don't let people try to influence you, your only friends will be the Republican Movement. If I die, never let the family be ashamed. If I die, I'll die in the knowledge that my life was for the cause and for the other boys here. If at my funeral the press say, "See how the IRA let your son die", just say, "My son died as an Irish soldier, not a British criminal".

He spent 53 days on hunger strike, from 27 October to 18 December and, according to a doctor had only a few hours left to live when the strike was called off.

== Split from Provisional IRA ==
In 1986, alongside 25 republican prisoners in HM Prison Maze, McKearney split from the Provisional IRA and formed a new organisation called the League of Communist Republicans. McKearney was the main theoretician behind the group, which took on a Marxist-Leninist outlook and analysis of Northern Ireland. McKearney called on the Provisional IRA to either return to a "ground war" against the British state or cease fighting altogether, rather than its strategy at that time of seldom but spectacular attacks. The members of the League believed that the "spectacular" attacks were too often botched, and too often resulted in the deaths of IRA members. The league rejected electoralism and instead called for mass struggle against the British. However, it also made clear this mass struggle must be led by a Vanguard party.

The League would fold in 1991 following the collapse of the Soviet Union.

== Release ==
McKearney was released from prison in 1993, having served 16 years of his sentence. In 2003 he appeared in the BBC documentary Life After Life. He is now a freelance journalist, edits the publication Fourthwrite, and is an organiser for the Independent Workers Union of Ireland.
