= Balmoral Park =

Balmoral Park can mean:

- Balmoral Park, Illinois, a horse racing track in Crete, Illinois
- Balmoral Park, Lisburn, an exhibition and business park in Lisburn, Northern Ireland
- It is also the name of two places in Australia
