= Margaretta D'Arcy =

Irish actress, writer and activist (1934–2025)

- Born: 14 June 1934; Whitechapel, London, England
- Died: 23 November 2025 (aged 91); Galway, Ireland
- Education: Trinity College Dublin
- Occupations: Actress; playwright; activist
- Spouse: John Arden (m. 1957; died 2012)
- Children: 5
- Honours: Aosdána member (1981–2025)

Margaretta Ruth D'Arcy (14 June 1934 – 23 November 2025) was an Irish actress, writer, playwright and activist.

D'Arcy was a founding member of the Irish association of artists, known as Aosdána, from its inauguration and was known for addressing Irish nationalism, civil liberties, and women's rights in her work.

In 2014, she was imprisoned for trespassing on a runway during protests over United States military stopovers at Shannon Airport.

== Background and theatrical life ==
D'Arcy was born in Whitechapel, East London on 14 June 1934 to an Irish Catholic father Joseph D'Arcy and an Odesa-born Jewish mother Miriam. Her aunt and mother's sister is Hannah Bilig, known as The Angel of Cable Street. After World War II, the family relocated to Dublin while D'Arcy went to boarding school at the Dominican Convent in Cabra. D'Arcy worked in small theatres in Dublin from the age of fifteen and studied drama at Trinity College Dublin.

D'Arcy worked at Dublin's Pike Theatre Dublin in 1953 before moving back to London to pursue her acting career. In 1957, D'Arcy married English playwright and author John Arden, and they frequently collaborated. The couple settled in Galway in 1968 and established the Galway Theatre Workshop in 1976. The couple had five sons, one of whom predeceased his mother.

The couple wrote a number of stage pieces and improvisational works for amateur and student players, including The Happy Haven (1960) and The Workhouse Donkey. She wrote and produced many plays, including The Non-Stop Connolly Show.

D'Arcy wrote a number of books, including Tell Them Everything, Awkward Corners (with John Arden), and Galway's Pirate Women: A Global Trawl.

== Activism ==
In 1961, D'Arcy joined the anti-nuclear Committee of 100, a British direct-action group associated with Bertrand Russell. Her involvement placed her within a strand of Cold War era protest that rejected both nuclear weapons and conventional parliamentary lobbying in favour of civil disobedience.

Circa 1968, after relocating to Galway, D'Arcy joined Sinn Féin. However, she was expelled from the party in 1972 over "political differences".

In 1981, her peace activism resulted in imprisonment in Armagh Women's Prison after she defaced a wall at the Ulster Museum. During her incarceration, she was held alongside women involved in the Armagh Prison no-wash protest. Her later account of this period documented the treatment of imprisoned republican women and addressed themes of Republicanism, state authority, and political imprisonment.

From the early 1980s onwards, D'Arcy was involved with the peace movement associated with the Greenham Common Women's Peace Camp, which opposed the stationing of US cruise missiles at RAF Greenham Common. She supported and documented the actions of women who engaged in direct action, legal challenges, and sustained protest against nuclear weapons in Britain.

From 1987, she engaged in activism around media access and censorship, including running a women's kitchen pirate radio station from her home in Galway.

During the 2000s, D'Arcy became involved in the Shell to Sea campaign in County Mayo, supporting local opposition to the Corrib gas project. She participated in solidarity actions and protests connected to Rossport, aligning herself with community-based environmental and anti-corporate activism.

In 2010, she became an early signatory to a boycott pledge promoted by the Ireland Palestine Solidarity Campaign, publicly identifying herself with cultural and political opposition to Israeli state policies towards Palestinians.

In 2011, at an Aosdana meeting, D'Arcy refused to stand for a minute's silence in honour of Ronan Kerr, a PSNI officer killed by dissident republicans. She stated that the refusal was deliberate and political. The action generated significant controversy and public criticism, with some commentators interpreting it as tacit support for armed republican groups, an interpretation she did not accept.

In October 2012, alongside Niall Farrell, D'Arcy was arrested after scaling the perimeter fence of Shannon Airport in protest at its use as a stopover for US military flights. She received a suspended sentence. The protest formed part of her long-standing opposition to Irish facilitation of US military operations. She was released after serving nine and a half weeks of the sentence. In 2014, after refusing to sign a bond committing her to avoid unauthorised areas of Shannon Airport, her suspended sentence was reactivated. She served nine and a half weeks in custody at Limerick Prison and the Dóchas Centre at Mountjoy Prison. Following her release, she continued to attend and support the Shannonwatch Peace Vigil and remained publicly active in anti-war campaigning.

In 2024, at the age of 89, D'Arcy ran as an independent candidate in the 2024 Galway City Council election. She was encouraged to stand by Sentient Rights Ireland and cited concerns about gender balance, democratic representation, and environmental and animal rights as reasons for her candidacy. She was not elected.

In October 2025, she relinquished an honorary doctorate awarded by the University of Galway in 2022, stating that the decision was a protest against the university's institutional links with Israel. In the same year, she campaigned in support of Catherine Connolly during the 2025 Irish presidential election. President Connolly visited D'Arcy in hospital two weeks before her death.

Until shortly before her death, D'Arcy remained active in anti-war organising, including attendance at peace vigils at Shannon Airport and leafleting in support of Ireland's Triple Lock mechanism on overseas military deployment.

== Death ==
D'Arcy died on 23 November 2025 at the age of 91.

== Affiliations ==
- Aosdána (member since its inauguration)
- Member of the World Association of Community Radio Broadcasters (AMARC)
- Executive member of AMARC's Women's International Network (WIN)

== Works ==
=== Books ===
Her books include;

- D'Arcy, Margaretta (1981) [1962], Tell them everything: a sojourn in the prison of Her Majesty Queen Elizabeth II at Ard Macha (Armagh), Pluto Press, ISBN 978-0-86104-349-1
- D'Arcy, Margaretta; Arden, John (1988), Awkward corners: essays, papers, fragments, London: Methuen, ISBN 978-0-413-40340-7
- D'Arcy, Margaretta; Arden, John (1991), Plays: 1: The Business of Good Government, The Royal Pardon, The Little Gray Home in the West, Ars Longa Vita Brevis, Friday's Hiding, Vandaleur's Folly, and Immediate Rough Theatre, Methuen Publishing Limited, ISBN 978-0-413-65150-1
- D'Arcy, Margaretta; Arden, John (1996), Galways Pirate Women, a Global Trawl, Women's Pirate Press, ISBN 978-0-9528206-0-4
- D'Arcy, Margaretta (2005), Loose Theatre: Memoirs of a Guerrilla Theatre Activist, Canada: Trafford Publishing & Women's Pirate Press, ISBN 1-4120-3376-4, OCLC 62894742, archived from the original on 11 June 2007

=== Plays ===
Her plays include;

- The Pinprick of History;
- Vandaleur's Folly;
- Women's Voices from W. of Ireland;
- Prison-voice of Countess Markievicz;
- A Suburban Suicide (a radio play, BBC3, 1995);
- Lajwaad (The Good People, play by Abdelkader Alloula, adapted by M. D'Arcy for readings in London, 1995);
- Dublin (Irish Writers' Centre, 1996).

Plays devised as group productions include;

- Muggins is a Martyr;
- The Vietnam War-game;
- 200 Years of Labour;
- The Mongrel Fox;
- No Room at the Inn;
- Mary's Name;
- Seán O'Scrúdu;
- Silence.

Plays written in collaboration with John Arden include;

- The Business of Good Government;
- The Happy Haven;
- Ars Longa Vita Brevis;
- The Royal Pardon;
- The Hero Rises Up;
- The Ballygombeen Bequest;
- The Non-Stop Connolly Show;
- ‘’The Island of the Mighty, A Trilogy’’ 1972
- Keep the People Moving (BBC Radio);
- Portrait of a Rebel (RTÉ Television);
- The Manchester Enthusiasts (BBC 1984 and RTÉ 1984, under the title The Ralahine Experiment);
- Whose is the Kingdom? (9-part radio play, BBC 1987).

=== Films ===
Films as a director and those produced by Women in Media & Entertainment;

- Yellow Gate Women, 2007, shown at the 'Galway Film Fleadh' and Independent International Video & Film Festival (New York) [2008].
- Shell Hell, co-directed by Finn Arden, 2005, shown at Galway Arts Festival, the 'Stranger than Fiction Festival' at the IFC (Dublin) and the Human Rights Documentary Festival (Glasgow).
- Big Plane, Small Axe, the mistrials of Mary Kelly, 2005, awarded 2nd Prize for Best Feature Documentary at Galway Film Fleadh, and also shown at Cork Film Festival, Portobello Film Festival, Human Rights Documentary Festival (Glasgow), and the Irish Film Festival (San Francisco).
- Circus Exposé, 1987 (60 minutes), shown at the Celtic Film Festival (Inverness) and Foyle Festival (Derry).

== See also ==
- List of peace activists
