= Balmoral Show =

Agricultural show in Northern Ireland

The Balmoral Show is a three-day show that is Northern Ireland's largest agri-food event. It takes place during May in Balmoral Park, Lisburn. It typically includes showjumping competitions, motorcycle displays, bands, shopping, tasting, a children's farm, and displays of falconry, pedigree horses, ponies, cattle, sheep, poultry, pigs and goats. It is organised by the North East Agricultural Association of Ireland, and was first held in 1855 at Belfast Corporation Markets. The 150th anniversary show was held in 2018.

== History ==
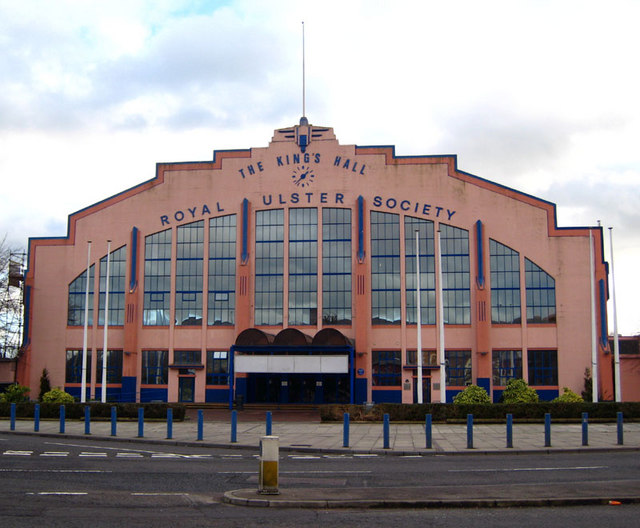
The King's Hall in Belfast (built 1896) hosted the show for many years

Formed in 1854, the North East Agricultural Association of Ireland held the first shows at Belfast Corporation Markets between 1855 and 1895. In 1872, the first three-day show was held in Ormeau Park in association with the Royal Agricultural Society of Ireland.

In 1894, the showgrounds at Balmoral were purchased and works were completed in time for the opening of the yearly Annual Show, subsequently renamed the Balmoral Show, on 30 June 1896. The show achieved the addition of Royal to its name in 1903.

The King's Hall, Belfast opened its doors at the Balmoral site in 1934. In 2012, RUAS members voted to purchase and relocate the show to the site of the former HM Prison Maze, near Sprucefield, in Lisburn. The Royal Ulster Agricultural Society redeveloped the area of the site purchased into Northern Ireland's largest events venue, the Eikon Exhibition Centre.

In 2018, the RUAS celebrated the 150th Balmoral Show at the new Balmoral Park site.

The event was cancelled in the years from 1915 to 1918 (World War I), from 1940 to 1945 (World War II), and in 2001 for foot and mouth disease. It was cancelled again in 2020, and the 2021 event was delayed until September, as part of the response to the COVID-19 pandemic in Northern Ireland.

== Events ==
Sponsored by Ulster Bank, the show typically includes showjumping competitions, motorcycle displays, bands, shopping, tasting, a children's farm, and displays of falconry, pedigree horses, ponies, cattle, sheep, poultry, pigs and goats. It is Northern Ireland's largest agri-food event.
