= John Hinds (doctor) =

Northern Irish physician

- Born: 21 March 1980; Newtownards, Northern Ireland
- Died: 4 July 2015 (aged 35); Skerries, County Dublin, Republic of Ireland
- Education: Queen's University Belfast
- Years active: 1998—2015
- Known for: Medical cover for motorcycle racing events
- Relatives: Dr Janet Acheson (Spouse)
- Medical career
- Profession: Doctor
- Field: Anaesthesia, intensive care medicine
- Institutions: Craigavon Area Hospital, County Armagh

John Hinds (21 March 1980 – 4 July 2015) was a Northern Irish doctor known for his contributions to prehospital care and high-speed motorcycle trauma medicine. He was a consultant anaesthetist and intensive care doctor at Craigavon Area Hospital in County Armagh.

== Early life ==
Hinds was born on 21 March 1980 in Newtownards, Northern Ireland. From the age of seventeen, he was a motorcycle enthusiast.

He studied at Queen's University Belfast and graduated with a medical degree in 2003. In 2012 he gained his CCT, with dual accreditation in Anaesthesia and Intensive Care Medicine.

== Motorcycle doctor ==
He had a voluntary role as part of the Motorcycle Union of Ireland's medical team and regularly provided medical cover for motorcycle racing events, joining the team in 2003. Hinds was one of two doctors who were mounted on motorcycles to provide a rapid response, often referred to colloquially as "The Flying Doctors" in reference to the very high speeds at which they deployed. He had a well-established partnership with his colleague, Fred MacSorley. The two rode as 'travelling doctors', following the riders on the warm-up and opening lap of each race or practice session, enabling them to be on scene rapidly in the event of a serious incident occurring. They were also supported by response vehicles staffed by other doctors and paramedics.

== Medical education ==
He lectured in trauma science at the Queen Mary University of London. Over several years, Hinds was a speaker at the Social Media and Critical Care Conference (SMACC), giving presentations such as "more cases from the races" and "Crack the Chest: Get Crucified".

== Air ambulance campaigning ==
Hinds campaigned for Northern Ireland to have its own air ambulance. In June 2015, he met Health Minister Simon Hamilton to discuss his concerns.

== Death ==
On the evening of 3 July 2015, Hinds was involved in an accident while providing medical cover at a Skerries 100 practice session. He was taken to Beaumont Hospital in Dublin but died the following day from his injuries. At the coroner's inquest into his death, the medical pathologist's report confirmed the cause of death to be multiple traumatic injuries after his motorcycle hit a wall when on roads closed-off to the public for the duration of racing. He is survived by his wife, Janet Acheson.

Hinds was posthumously awarded a BBC Get Inspired Unsung Hero award, in recognition of his volunteering work in sport. The College of Paramedics posthumously awarded him the title of honorary fellow. The college later set up a scholarship in his name.

Following his death, his widow campaigned for an air ambulance to be launched in his honour.

On 21 March 2016, the day that would have been Hind's 36th birthday, the key findings of a Helicopter Emergency Medical Service consultation were announced. £4 million of funding had been granted towards the project. The aircraft base is at Maze LongKesh, the site of a former prison, outside of Lisburn. There were calls for the aircraft to be named "Delta 7", the callsign formerly assigned to Hinds by the Northern Ireland Ambulance Service for whom he responded as one of a group of volunteer BASICS doctors.

In August 2016, it was announced that Air Ambulance Northern Ireland would partner with the health service in Northern Ireland to provide the helicopter emergency medical service (HEMS) in Northern Ireland. The charity operates in partnership with the Northern Ireland Ambulance Service to provide the aviation side of the service and fund the non-medical costs of HEMS.

The helicopter service was first officially deployed in August 2017, after attending incidents earlier during preparatory and training time.
