= Air Ambulance Northern Ireland =

British charity air ambulance

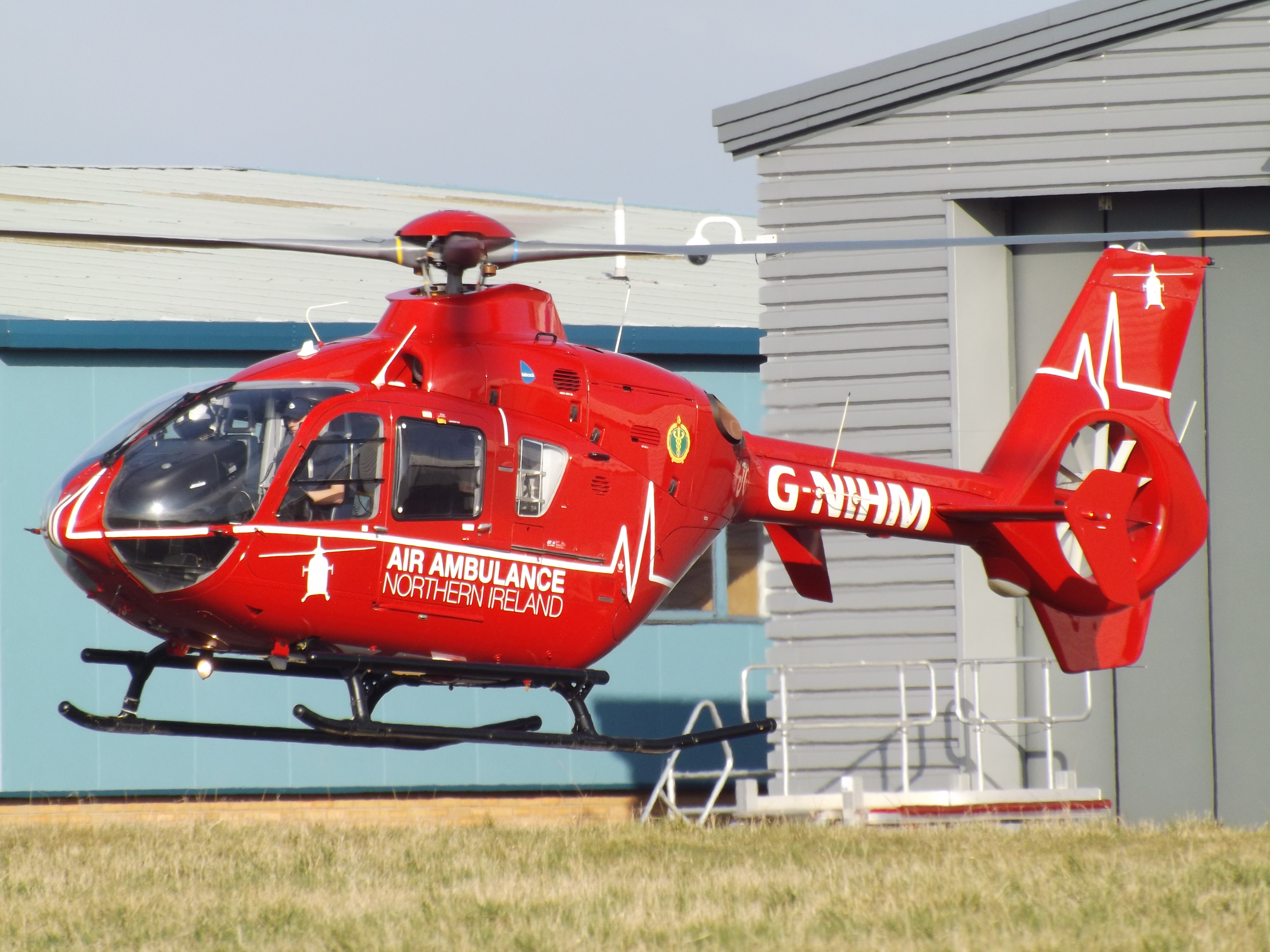
- AANI Eurocopter EC135 helicopter
- Type: Charitable organisation
- Registration no.: NIC103900
- Location: Balmoral Park, Lisburn
- Region served: Northern Ireland
- Aircraft operated: AgustaWestland AW109S Grand (Primary) and AgustaWestland AW109E Power (Back-up)
- Revenue: £4.5 million (2024)
- Employees: 10 (2024)
- Volunteers: 150 (2024)
- Website: airambulanceni.org

Air Ambulance Northern Ireland (AANI) also known as Air Ambulance NI is a registered charity that operates a helicopter emergency medical service (HEMS) dedicated to responding to serious trauma and medical emergencies in Northern Ireland.

In August 2016, it was announced by the Northern Ireland government that Air Ambulance NI was partnering with the health service in Northern Ireland to provide the HEMS. The charity works in partnership with the Northern Ireland Ambulance Service (NIAS), with AANI providing the aviation side of the service and funding the non-medical costs of HEMS, with NIAS being commissioned to provide the clinical staff, equipment, clinical governance arrangements and operational tasking.

The service is based at Maze Long Kesh near Lisburn, where they operate both their primary and back-up aircraft from, having previously operated their back-up aircraft from their secondary base at St Angelo Airport in County Fermanagh. The helicopter has the call sign Helimed 23 in keeping with the Helimed callsigns of all UK air ambulance helicopters, and will typically transfer patients with serious injuries to the Royal Victoria Hospital in Belfast, Northern Ireland's major trauma centre.

In September 2022, AANI announced a ten-year partnership agreement with Sloane Helicopters Limited to provide two HEMS AgustaWestland AW109 helicopters, pilots and aircraft maintenance. As part of the agreement, Sloane Helicopters provided an AW109S Grand as AANI's primary aircraft and an AW109E Power as their dedicated back-up aircraft, both of which will be operated from its airbase outside Lisburn.

== History ==
Historically, Northern Ireland has been the only part of the United Kingdom and Ireland, without air ambulance provision and several previous attempts to introduce a HEMS failed. A comprehensive report published in February 2004 argued against the provision of an air ambulance service from Scotland in favour of either a separate Northern Ireland service, or one provided as part of an all Ireland coordinated system.

In 2006, Rodney Connor, chief executive of Fermanagh District Council, and Peter Quinn, consultant, produced a report on the need for an air ambulance in rural areas and after presentation to the council was brought to the attention of the Department for Health. In 2012, Connor decided to work again on the need for an air ambulance and along with the Minister for DETI brought together a group of Trustees. The trustees of the AANI came together in December 2013 to commence the process of forming a charity-led company to run an air ambulance. Independently, in late 2013, Dr John Hinds and other members of the Northern Ireland Regional Faculty of Prehospital care began discussing ways of encouraging the development of a fully-fledged HEMS at a time when the only air support for casualty evacuation was from either Coastguard or PSNI helicopters. After a near fatal accident at the North West 200 motorcycle race in May 2015, Hinds' views received widespread support and he began a public campaign for Northern Ireland to have its own air ambulance. In March 2016, the key findings of a HEMS consultation were announced.

In August 2016, it was announced by the Northern Ireland government that Air Ambulance NI would partner with the health service in Northern Ireland to provide the helicopter emergency medical service.

The clinical model has from the outset been based on a doctor and paramedic working in partnership, with the doctors seconded from consultant tier emergency medicine and anaesthetic/critical care physicians across Northern Ireland. The doctors undertake the HEMS role on a part-time basis alongside their primary posts in order to maintain clinical and organisational skills on both fronts. The paramedics were drawn from within the Northern Ireland Ambulance Service and alongside the doctors have undertaken a comprehensive training programme encompassing clinical skills, crew resource management and flight operations training.

The service was scheduled to go live in August 2017, but actually undertook their first live mission on 22 July 2017 during one of their final training flights, when they were deployed to a child seriously injured in a farming accident near Castlewellan. The child was transferred by helicopter to the Royal Belfast Hospital for Sick Children.

== Finances ==
Two of the trustees, Connor and Foran produced a business plan which was then brought to the Chancellor of the Exchequer and, in March 2016, AANI were successful in applying to the Chancellor's Libor banking fines fund, and were awarded £3.5 million to establish and support the HEMS service in Northern Ireland. A further £1M in matched funding thereafter was also pledged.

In the year ending March 2024, the charity's income was £4.5M. Expenditure was £2.4M.

== See also ==
- Emergency Aeromedical Service – the air ambulance service for the Republic of Ireland
- Air ambulances in the United Kingdom
