= HM Prison Armagh =

Former prison in County Armagh, Northern Ireland

Coordinates: 54.347°N 6.648°W

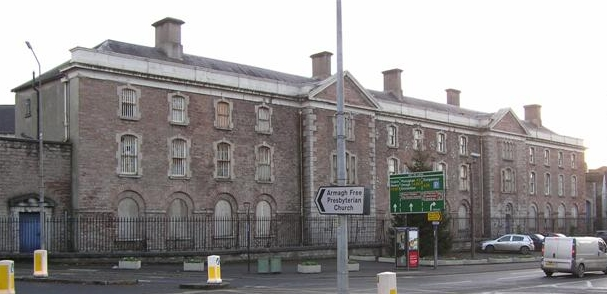
Armagh Prison

HM Prison Armagh, also known as Armagh Gaol, is a former prison in Armagh, Northern Ireland. The construction of the prison began in 1780 to a design of Thomas Cooley and it was extended in the style of Pentonville Prison in the 1840 and 1850s. For most of its working life Armagh Gaol was the primary women's prison in Ulster. Although the prison is often described as Armagh Women's Gaol, at various points in its history, various wings in the prison were used to hold male prisoners.

During the period of the internment, 33 republican women were interned in the prison from 1973 to 1975.

On 19 April 1979, Agnes Wallace (40), a prison officer, was shot dead and three colleagues were injured in an Irish National Liberation Army (INLA) gun and grenade attack outside the prison.

The prison was the scene of a protest by female Irish republican prisoners demanding the reinstatement of political status, although the numbers involved were much smaller than in the Maze (also known as Long Kesh) men's prison. As all women prisoners in Northern Ireland already had the right to wear their own clothes, they did not stage any sort of blanket protest, but abstained from doing prison work. In 1979, several prisoners joined the no wash protest held by IRA prisoners in the Maze. Their tactics included the smearing of menstrual blood on the cell walls. Three women in Armagh took part in the 1980 hunger strike: Mairéad Nugent, Mary Doyle and Mairéad Farrell, who would later be killed by the Special Air Service (SAS) in Gibraltar in 1988. No Armagh prisoners took part in the 1981 Irish hunger strike.

The prison closed in 1986. In 2009 it was announced that the prison was to become a hotel.

Armagh Prison was the subject of one of the so-called black spider memos written by Charles, Prince of Wales to the Secretary of State for Northern Ireland in 2004.
