= Fred MacSorley =

Medical doctor from Northern Ireland

- Years active: 1980s–present
- Known for: Medical cover for motorcycle racing events
- Medical career
- Profession: Doctor
- Field: General Practitioner
- Sub-specialties: Prehospital care, High Speed Accidents

Frederick James MacSorley MBE FRCGP is a doctor from Northern Ireland who provided medical cover at motorcycle races for more than 20 years. He worked as a General Practitioner (GP).

== Early life ==
MacSorley came from a medical family in Belfast.

== Medical career ==
He registered in Belfast in 1978 and has worked as a GP, based in Lurgan since 1992. He also had a role as a BASICS doctor.

In the 2002 he devised a programme of self-defence classes for GPs.

MacSorley was one of the team that pioneered the concept of a mobile response at motorcycle racing events in the mid-1980s. He worked as part of the Motorcycle Union of Ireland's medical team. In September 2014, MacSorley retired from being a "travelling doctor" at motorcycle competitions. He had previously had a well-established partnership with his colleague John Hinds. Hinds died the following year while providing medical cover at a race. He retired from his GP role and event medical cover in 2017.

== Honours ==
MacSorley was Northern Ireland Doctor of the Year in 1999. He received a MBE in the 2011 Birthday Honours for services to Healthcare in Northern Ireland.
