= Hannah Billig =

English medical doctor (1901–1987)

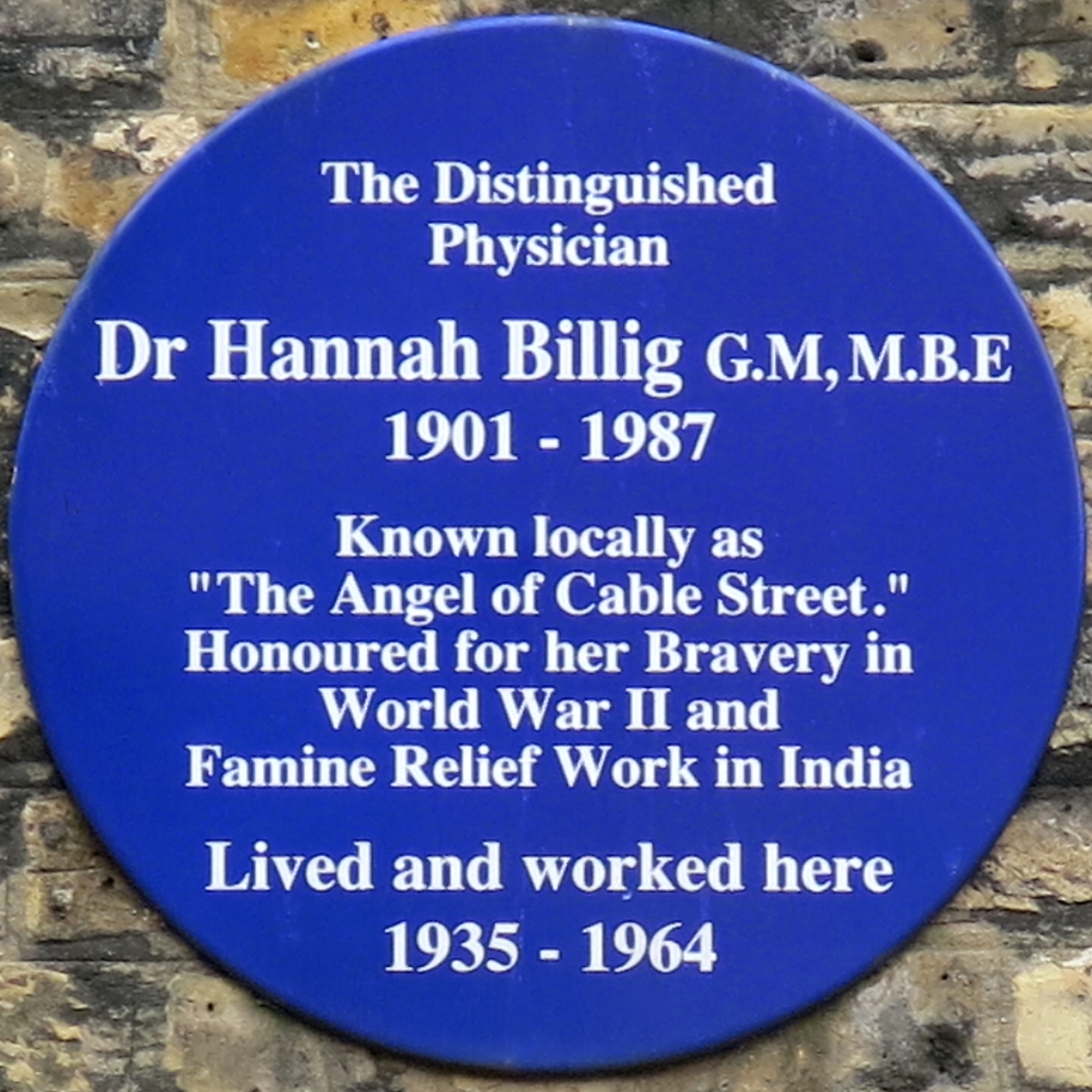
Hannah Billig's blue plaque on 198, Cable Street

Hannah Billig, MBE GM (4 October 1901 – 11 July 1987) was a British medical doctor who worked in the East End of London. Billig was popular among her patients and her exceptional medical work during the Second World War earned her honours and awards, as well as the nickname "The Angel of Cable Street". After the war, she resumed her medical practice on Cable Street before retiring to Israel, continuing her medical work there until her death.

== Childhood ==
Billig was born at 41 Hanbury Street, Spitalfields, in the East End of London, and grew up around Brick Lane where Jewish friends had taken them in. Her parents, Barnett and Milly Billig, were refugees from Russia, escaping from anti-Jewish pogroms. The Billig family had six children, four of whom became doctors. Her sister was a nurse and a brother Levi was an oriental studies scholar who was shot dead in Jerusalem in 1936. Parents Barnett and Milly encouraged their children to spend their time reading instead of playing in the streets. Her mother stayed home with the children, managing the household, while Barnett worked as a newsagent rolling cigarettes and eventually as a cigar roller. At the age of 11, Billig received a scholarship to attend Myrdle Street Central School in Stepney. She remained at the top of her class which eventually earned her a scholarship to London University.

== Early medical career ==
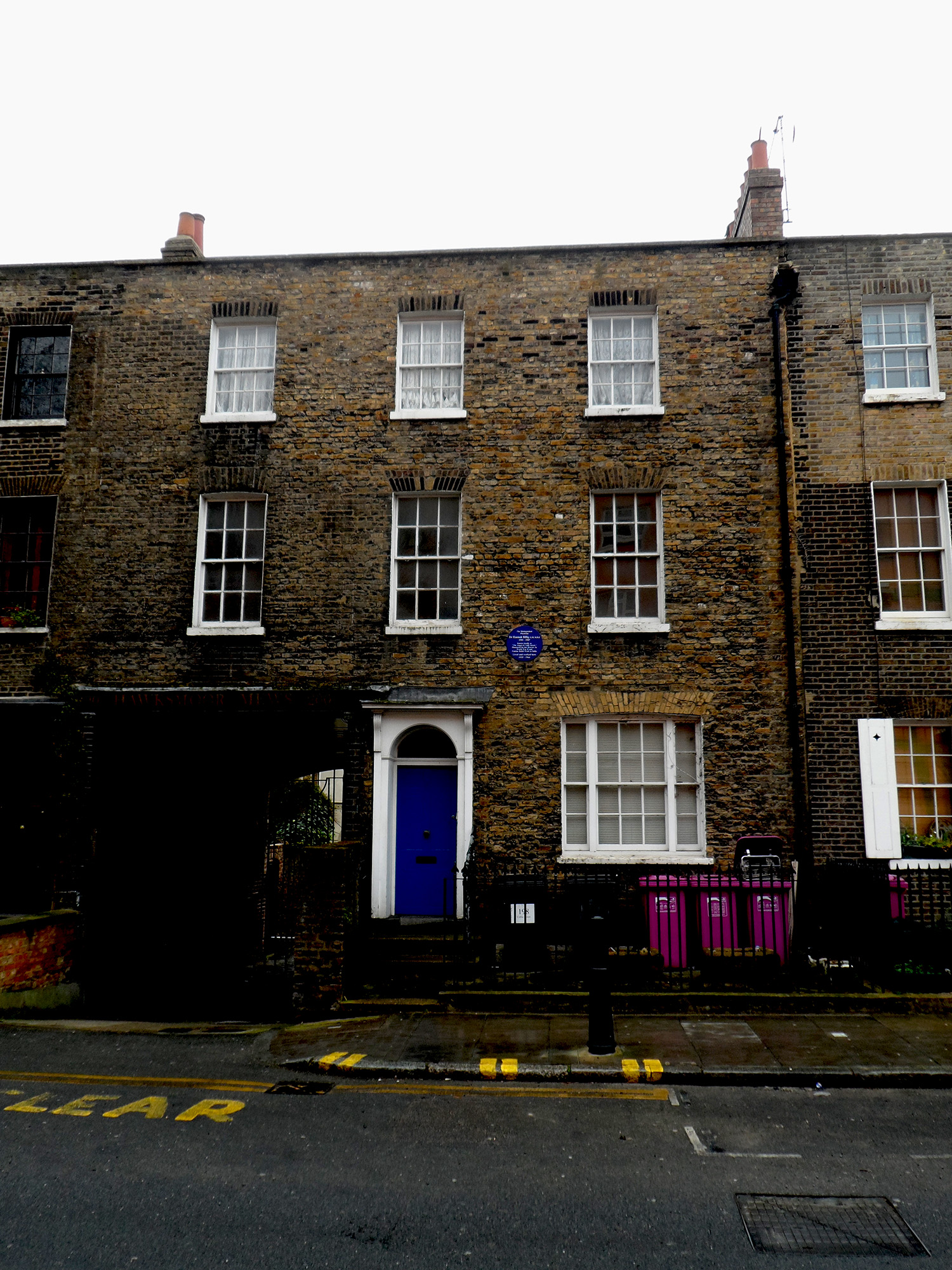
198, Cable Street, Billig's surgery and home

Billig won a scholarship to the University of London to read medicine. She trained at the Royal Free Hospital and the Royal London Hospital, and qualified as a doctor in 1925. She worked for two years at the Jewish Maternity Hospital in Underwood Street. In 1927, she set up a small clinic near Cable Street, moving her surgery in 1935 round the corner to a Georgian townhouse at 198, Cable Street, where a blue plaque commemorates her work. Billig was also on call as a police surgeon which meant she often had to leave in the middle of whatever she was doing, even surgery. She used to cycle to her patients, with her black bag; later she drove a Morris Cowley car. Billig was fond of children, encouraging them to bring books for her to read to them and letting some carry her doctor bag – which was considered a great honour by the children.

Her daily schedule was based around surgeries in the morning and evening, home visits in the afternoon and the occasional night visit for patients giving birth or falling ill in the middle of the night. The area she was based in was poor and people had trouble affording the consultation and medicine fees. There was not a national health service so it was common for people to delay calling on a doctor until their symptoms were extremely serious.

== Second World War and awards ==
During the Blitz, Billig was the doctor in charge of the air raid shelters in Wapping. During bombing raids, she tended the sick and injured in the underground shelters. On 13 March 1941, Billig was attending to residents of Orient Wharf in Wapping following a bomb blast. An explosion threw her out of the shelter and broke her ankle. After bandaging it herself, she helped to get the others out of the rubble, and cared for them through the night.

For her bravery, Billig was awarded the George Medal. The citation read; "Hannah Billig, M.B., B.S., Medical Practitioner, Stepney. During an air raid Dr. Billig, although herself injured, left shelter to attend to casualties in the street. Bombs dropped within twenty yards of her but for four hours she continued to give treatment to the injured. She showed great bravery and attention to duty, regardless of her personal safety and injuries."

In January 1943 she was commissioned in the Indian Medical Service and posted to Calcutta. Captain Billig was appointed Member of the Order of the British Empire (MBE) in the 1945 New Year Honours for her work in Calcutta in the aftermath of the Bengal famine.

== Later years and death ==
Billig returned to Cable Street and worked within the new National Health Service until her retirement in 1964. In 1962, she was elected as president of the London Jewish Hospital Medical Society. She moved to Caesarea on the coast of Israel and, after learning the language well enough, she worked in Arab villages and Jewish settlements. Billig continued to work into her 80s until her health began to interfere. She died there on 11 July 1987, aged 85. She never married.

== Family ==
Billig's niece is the Irish actress, writer, playwright and activist, Margaretta D'Arcy.
