= Kieran Nugent =

Irish republican

Kieran Nugent (12th September 1958 - 3rd May 2000) was an Irish volunteer in the Provisional Irish Republican Army (IRA) and best known for being the first IRA 'blanket man' in the Maze Prison in Northern Ireland. When sentenced to three years for hijacking a bus, Nugent refused to wear a prison uniform and said the prison guards would have to "...nail it to my back".

== Early life ==
Nugent was an adolescent in the North of Ireland during the most intense years of the Troubles. On 20 March 1973, aged 15, he was standing with a friend on the corner of Merrion Street and Grosvenor Road, West Belfast, when a car pulled up beside them and one of the occupants asked them for directions. Another occupant of the vehicle then opened fire with a submachine gun. Nugent was seriously wounded after being shot eight times in the chest, arms and back by the loyalists in the car. His friend, Bernard McErlean, aged 16, was killed.

== Prison life ==
At some point afterwards, Nugent joined the IRA. He was arrested, aged 16, by the British Army and spent five months on remand in Crumlin Road Prison, Belfast. When he was eventually tried, the case against him was withdrawn and he was released.

He became an active volunteer until his arrest and internment, without trial, on 9 February 1975. He served nine months in Cage 4 of Long Kesh Detention Centre in Northern Ireland, until 12 November 1975.

He was arrested and imprisoned again on 12 May 1976, for the hijacking of a bus. On 14 September 1976 he was sentenced to three years, and returned to the same prison, which was renamed the Maze. He became the first republican prisoner convicted since the withdrawal of Special Category Status for those convicted through juryless courts, due to the British policy of 'criminalisation', reintroduced that March. Among other things, this change in policy meant convicted paramilitaries could no longer wear their own clothes. He refused to wear the uniform, declaring himself a political prisoner and not a criminal, beginning the blanket protest.

He was soon joined by Jackie McMullan, the next prisoner to wear a blanket instead of a uniform, followed by six more Irish republican prisoners from the Beechmount area of Belfast. By Christmas 1976, the number of participants had risen to over forty prisoners. Most incoming republican prisoners emulated Nugent and this started five years of prison protests in pursuit of political status, which culminated in the 1981 hunger strike and the death of seven IRA and three Irish National Liberation Army prisoners.

== Death ==
On 3 May 2000, Nugent died from a heart attack in his Andersonstown, Belfast home surrounded by loved ones, aged 42. He had four children, 10 grandchildren and just recently a great granddaughter.
