= Blanket protest =

Part of a five-year protest during the Troubles

The blanket protest was part of a five-year protest during the Troubles by Provisional Irish Republican Army (IRA) and Irish National Liberation Army (INLA) prisoners held in the Maze prison (also known as "Long Kesh") in Northern Ireland. The republican prisoners' status as political prisoners, known as Special Category Status, had begun to be phased out in 1976. Among other things, this meant that they would now be required to wear prison uniforms like ordinary convicts. The prisoners refused to accept the administrative designation of ordinary criminals, and also to wear the prison uniform.

== Early blanket protests and hunger strikes ==
In 1917, a form of blanket protest was carried out by a single Irish Republican internee, Padraic Fleming in Maryborough (now Portlaoise Prison). Fleming was refused treatment as a political prisoner and went on hunger strike. There was considerable public outrage over the earlier death (by forced feeding) of Thomas Ashe and Fleming was released in November 1917. Fleming was rearrested in May 1918 and refused to wear prison uniforms which resulted in him being left naked and locked in his cell and (because he destroyed his cell) was restrained with a straight jacket. Fleming went on several long hunger strikes and finally was granted political prisoner status and transferred to Mountjoy Prison. Fleming escaped the prison with 19 others on 29 March 1919.

In 1920 several hunger strikes (Mountjoy and Cork) were conducted by Irish Republicans demanding political status, resulting in two deaths from starvation. Thousands of prisoners participated in the 1923 Irish hunger strikes, resulting in several deaths.

In mid-June 1943 a blanket protest was carried out by Irish Republican prisoners in Crumlin Road Gaol when 22 prisoners went on a "strip strike' for political status. Each morning every article (except a towel) was removed from the cells and the prisoners were left to sit on the floor until nighttime, when the bedding was returned.

IRA man Seán McCaughey died on hunger strike in Portlaoise Prison on 11 May, 1946. Refusing to wear prisoner clothes and demanding political status, McCaughey wore a blanket in solitary confinement for nearly five years. During the 20th century a total of 22 Irish Republicans died on hunger strike while demanding political status.

== Special category status ==
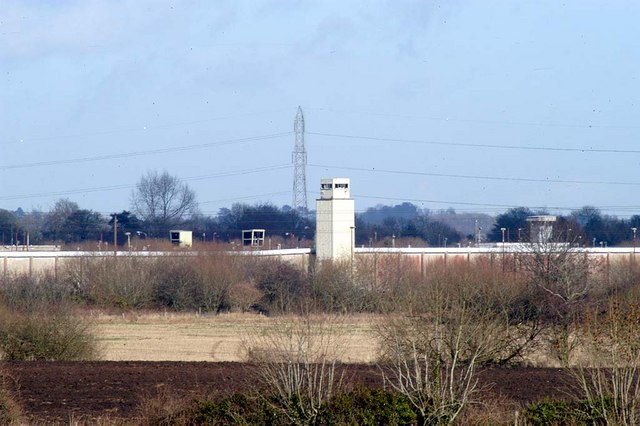
Maze prison outside of Belfast.

Convicted paramilitary prisoners were treated as ordinary criminals until July 1972, when Special Category Status was introduced following a hunger strike by 40 IRA prisoners led by the veteran republican Billy McKee. Special Category, or political, status meant prisoners were treated very much like prisoners of war; for example, they did not have to wear prison uniforms or do prison work. In 1976, as part of the policy of "criminalisation", the British Government brought an end to Special Category Status for paramilitary prisoners in Northern Ireland. The policy was not introduced for existing prisoners, but for those convicted after 1 March 1976.

The end to Special Category Status was a serious threat to the authority which the paramilitary leaderships inside prison had been able to exercise over their own men, as well as being a propaganda blow. The imminent withdrawal of Special Category Status caused relations between the prisoners and prison officers to deteriorate, and in early 1976 the IRA leaders in prison sent word to the IRA Army Council asking them to begin assassinating prison officers, stating "we are prepared to die for political status. Those who try to take it away from us must be fully prepared to pay the same price". Outside the prison the IRA responded by shooting prison officer Patrick Dillon in April 1976, the first of nineteen prison officers to be killed during the five-year protest.

The blanket protest began on 14 September 1976 when newly convicted prisoner Kieran Nugent refused to wear prison uniform. Nugent had previously been interned in the compounds of Long Kesh during 1975, but was arrested in May 1976 and received a three-year sentence after being convicted of possessing weapons and hijacking a car. In 1985, Nugent gave an interview describing his arrival at the newly constructed H-Blocks at the prison complex:

I was brought straight to the blocks. Cell 17, D wing H1 or 2. I was stripped and beaten. The screws who knew me said, 'We are the bosses now. There are no OCs here'. A screw said to me, 'What size are you in the waist and what size are you for shoes?' I asked him 'What for?' and he told me 'For a uniform'. I said, 'You have got to be joking'. I was the only one in the H-Blocks. They dragged me into the cell. Davy Long [one of the warders] wanted me to compromise. He suggested I wore my own shoes and trousers if I wore a prison shirt. I just laughed. He locked the door. I lay on the floor all night without mattress, blankets or anything else. The heat was reasonable in all fairness and I slept.

Nugent was given a blanket on the second day of his imprisonment, which he wore during an exercise period. Nugent only wore a prison uniform once, when his mother visited the prison. He told her:

You will not be seeing me for three years because to have a visit I have to wear uniform. If they want me to wear a uniform they'll have to nail it to my back.

Other newly convicted prisoners joined the protest, and at first they were allowed to wear blankets during the exercise period but eventually they were ordered to leave the blankets in their cells. As prison rules required the prisoners to wear prison uniform when leaving their cells, they were confined to their cells for twenty-four hours a day. The prison governor would order the protesting prisoners to wear uniforms every two weeks, and the prisoners refused. As a result of their refusal, they would receive three days "on the boards" where all furniture was removed from their cell, and they were served the "number one diet" consisting of tea without milk, watery soup and dry bread.

The refusal to comply with prison rules carried a further punishment, the loss of remission which reduced a prisoner's sentence by fifty percent in exchange for good behaviour. Prisoners were entitled to four visits from friends or family each month, three were in exchange for good behaviour and the fourth was statutory. Protesting prisoners automatically forfeited the three "privileged" visits, and their refusal to wear prison uniform even for visits meant they forfeited the fourth. This left one censored letter in and out of the prison each month as their only contact with the outside world, until after several months some prisoners compromised by agreeing to wear uniforms for visits to maintain contact with the paramilitary leaderships outside the prison.

As a result of the IRA's assassination campaign against prison officers, relations between the prisoners and prison officers were tense. In March 1978 some prisoners refused to leave their cells to shower or use the lavatory because of attacks by prison officers, and were provided with wash-hand basins in their cells. The prisoners requested showers be installed in their cells and when this request was turned down they refused to use the wash-hand basins.

== Dirty protest and hunger strikes ==
At the end of April 1978 a fight occurred between a prisoner and a prison officer in H-Block 6. The prisoner was taken away to solitary confinement, and news spread across the wing that the prisoner had been badly beaten. The prisoners responded by smashing the furniture in their cells, and the prison authorities responded by removing the remaining furniture from the cells leaving the prisoners in cells with just blankets and mattresses. The prisoners responded by refusing to leave their cells, and as a result the prison officers were unable to clear them. This resulted in the blanket protest escalating into the dirty protest, as the prisoners were unable to "slop out" (i.e., empty their chamber pots) so resorted to smearing excrement on the walls of their cells.

On 27 October 1980, IRA members Brendan Hughes, Tommy McKearney, Raymond McCartney, Tom McFeeley, Sean McKenna, Leo Green, and INLA member John Nixon, began a hunger strike aimed at restoring political status for paramilitary prisoners by securing what were known as the "Five Demands":

1. The right not to wear a prison uniform;
2. The right not to do prison work;
3. The right of free association with other prisoners, and to organise educational and recreational pursuits;
4. The right to one visit, one letter and one parcel per week;
5. Full restoration of remission lost through the protest.

After a 53-day hunger strike with McKenna lapsing in and out of a coma and on the brink of death, the government appeared to concede the essence of the prisoners' five demands with a 30-page document detailing a proposed settlement. With the document in transit to Belfast, Hughes took the decision to save McKenna's life and end the strike after 53 days on 18 December. In January 1981 it became clear that the prisoners' demands had not been conceded. On 4 February the prisoners issued a statement saying that the British government had failed to resolve the crisis and declared their intention of "hunger striking once more".

The 1981 Irish hunger strike began on 1 March when Bobby Sands refused food, and by the time the strike ended on 3 October, ten men, including Sands, had starved to death. Two days later, the incoming Northern Ireland Secretary, James Prior, announced a number of changes in prison policy, including that from then on all paramilitary prisoners would be allowed to wear their own clothes at all times.
