= Balmoral Park, Lisburn =

Exhibition park in Northern Ireland

Coordinates: 54.4879°N 6.1036°W

Balmoral Park is an exhibition park near Lisburn, Northern Ireland. It occupies the site of the previous Maze Long Kesh internment camp.

Balmoral Park is now the home of the Balmoral Show, organized by the Royal Ulster Agricultural Society. As of April 2020, the Eikon Exhibition Centre, which is located in the park, was being considered as a location for one of the NHS COVID-19 critical care hospitals.

It is also one of the two bases of Air Ambulance Northern Ireland.
