= Eikon Exhibition Centre =

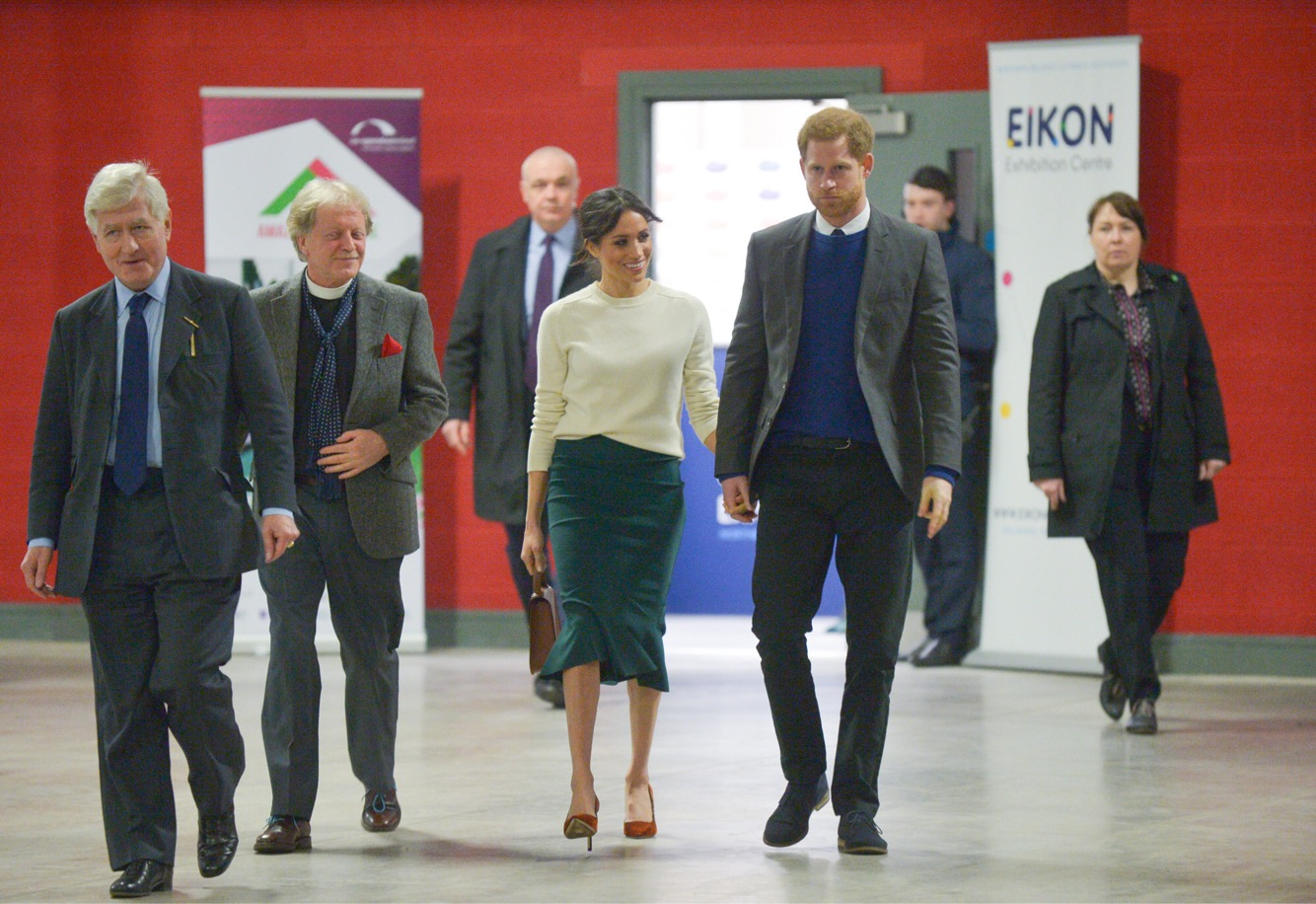
- Prince Harry and Meghan Markle visit the centre in March 2018
- Interactive map of Eikon Exhibition Centre
- Location: Lisburn, Northern Ireland
- Coordinates: 54.4876°N 6.1065°W

Construction
- Opened: September 2015
- Expanded: 2018

Website
- www.eikonexhibitioncentre.com

The Eikon Exhibition Centre is an events venue at Balmoral Park, Lisburn, Northern Ireland. The name comes from the Greek word "eikon" (English: image).

== History ==
The centre, which was developed by the Royal Ulster Agricultural Society, opened in September 2015. It was significantly expanded with the completion of the Dr E.F. Logan Hall (Note: Named in memory of Dr Ernest Fergus Logan, OBE, a former veterinary surgeon) in spring 2018.

== Facilities ==
The Eikon Exhibition Centre is Northern Ireland's largest events campus, set on a 65-acre site and with over 10,000 square metres of indoor, flexible event space.
