= Electoralism =

Halfway stage from authoritarian to democratic rule

Electoralism is a term first used by Terry Karl, professor of political science at Stanford University, to describe a "half-way" transition from authoritarian rule toward democratic rule.

As a topic in the dominant party system political science literature, electoralism describes a situation in which the transition out of hard-authoritarian rule is initiated and managed by the incumbent regime. However, the dominant position of the incumbent regime throughout the transition process prevents the transition from attaining the institutional qualities of liberal democracy. Other terms, such as guided transition or managed transition have been used to describe this process.

Under electoralism, the regime essentially conducts the electoral aspects of democratic governance in a relatively "free and fair" manner. Massive acts of voting fraud and election-day intimidation are essentially absent. However, other features of democracy, such as the rule of law and institutional separation of powers, are absent under electoralism. The entire election process is skewed in favor of the incumbent regime. The media tends to ignore or paint the opposition in a negative light, the high court and election commission tends to make judgements in favor of the incumbent, and on some occasions, opposition rallies are denied or canceled by the police.

== Examples ==
Some examples include:

- Tanzania after 1992
- Turkey after 2002
- Kenya after 1991
- Mexico between the late 1980s and 2000
- Russia after 1991
- Singapore
