= Special Category Status =

Categorisation of prisoners

In July 1972, William Whitelaw, the Conservative British government's Secretary of State for Northern Ireland, granted Special Category Status (SCS) to all prisoners serving sentences in Northern Ireland for Troubles-related offences. This had been one of the conditions set by the Provisional Irish Republican Army (IRA) when they negotiated a meeting with the government to discuss a truce.

Special category (or "political") status was de facto prisoner of war (POW) status, providing them with some of the privileges of POWs, such as those specified in the Geneva Conventions. This meant prisoners did not have to wear prison uniforms or do prison work, were housed within their paramilitary factions, and were allowed extra visits and food parcels.

SCS was introduced in 1972 by William Whitelaw while serving as Secretary of State for Northern Ireland. That year, Whitelaw explained the status in the House of Commons, while denying that political status had been granted:

Certain convicted prisoners in Belfast Prison who are located separately from other inmates are now allowed to wear their own clothes. They will be allowed to receive at least one visit and a food parcel each week and to spend their own money in the prison canteen. Their allocation of letters will also be increased... I have made it perfectly clear that the status of political prisoner is not being granted. What has been granted is similar to the facilities provided in the Parkhurst and Leicester wings in this country.

In January 1975 the Gardiner Committee, which looked at how the government should deal with "terrorism and subversion in Northern Ireland" in the "context of civil liberties and human rights", recommended the ending of SCS. It argued that SCS undermined the role of the prison authorities in maintaining discipline.

The government accepted the recommendation and on 1 March 1976, the new Labour Secretary of State Merlyn Rees announced the phasing out of SCS. Anyone convicted of a scheduled offence after March 1976 would be treated as an ordinary criminal and would have to wear a prison uniform, do prison work and serve their sentence in the new Maze Prison, in what became known as the H-Blocks. The response of some prisoners to this was violent, and six prison staff were killed in 1976 and 1977.

By late 1976, the new cellular prison accommodation recommended by Gardiner was ready to receive its first prisoners. In the week that Roy Mason took over from Merlyn Rees as Secretary of State, the first prisoner sentenced under the new policy arrived at the Maze and was ordered to wear a prison uniform. He was IRA volunteer Kieran Nugent, who had recently been convicted of hijacking a bus. Nugent refused to wear the uniform, saying he was not a criminal but a political prisoner. He was locked in his cell where he wrapped himself in the blanket that was on the bed rather than remain naked, beginning the blanket protest. This was the same action taken by old IRA prisoners in the south in the 1940s. By 1978, nearly 300 Irish republican prisoners were refusing to wear prison uniforms.

The protest was followed by the 1981 hunger strike when ten republican prisoners starved themselves to death in the Maze. The privileges were gradually phased back in afterwards, with the core demands of protesting prisoners in place by early 1983.
