= HM Prison Maze =

1971–2000 prison in Northern Ireland

Her Majesty's Prison Maze
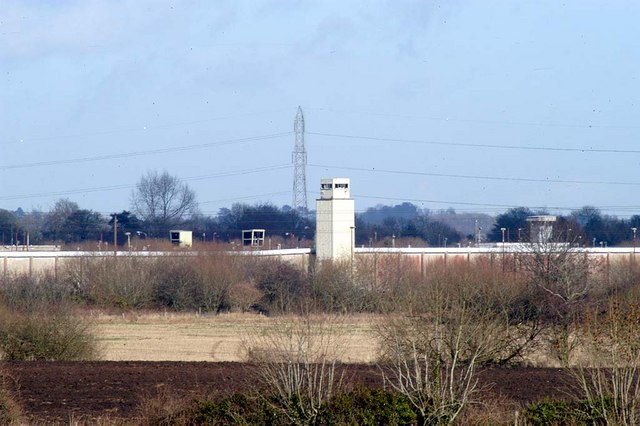
- Interactive map of Her Majesty's Prison Maze
- Location: Maze, County Down, Northern Ireland; 54°29′19″N 6°6′27″W
- Status: Partly demolished
- Security class: High
- Capacity: Variable
- Opened: 9 August 1971
- Closed: 29 September 2000
- Managed by: Northern Ireland Prison Service

HM Prison Maze (previously Long Kesh Detention Centre, and known colloquially as the Maze or H-Blocks) was a prison and internment camp in Northern Ireland that was used to house paramilitary prisoners during the Troubles from August 1971 to September 2000. On 15 October 1974 Irish Republican internees burned 21 of the compounds used to house the internees thereby destroying much of Long Kesh.

The prison was situated at the former Royal Air Force station of Long Kesh, on the outskirts of Lisburn. This was in the townland of Maze, about nine miles (14 km) southwest of Belfast. The prison and its inmates were involved in such events as the 1981 hunger strike. The prison was closed in 2000 and demolition began on 30 October 2006, but on 18 April 2013 it was announced by the Northern Ireland Executive that the remaining buildings would be redeveloped into a peace centre. However, these plans were later abandoned.

== Background ==
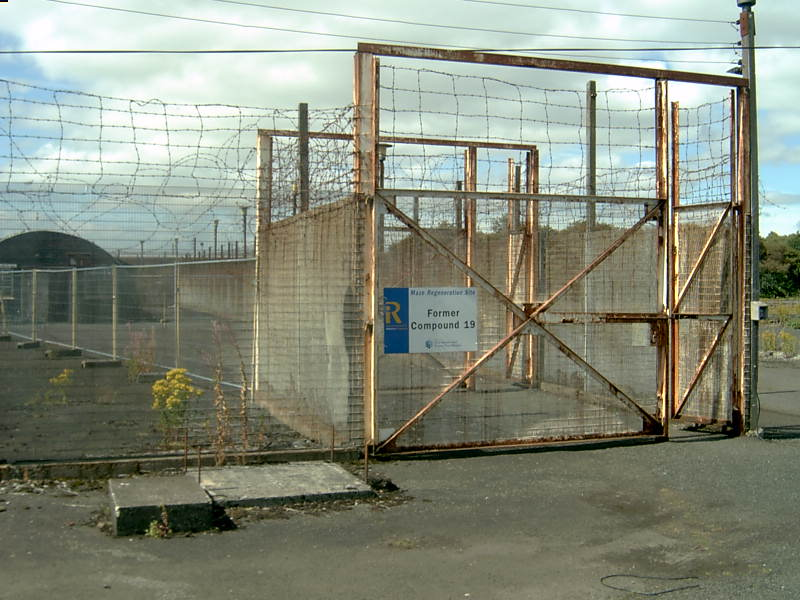
The entrance to Compound 19

Following the introduction of internment in 1971, Operation Demetrius was implemented by the Royal Ulster Constabulary (RUC) and British Army with raids for 452 suspects on 9 August 1971. The RUC and army arrested 342 Irish nationalists, but key Provisional Irish Republican Army (IRA) members had been tipped off and 104 of those arrested were released when it emerged they had no paramilitary connections. Those behind Operation Demetrius were accused of bungling the raids by arresting many of the wrong people and using out-of-date information. Following nationalist protests, some Ulster loyalists were also arrested. By 1972, there were 924 internees and by the end of internment on 5 December 1975, 1,981 people had been detained; 1,874 (94.6%) of whom were Catholic/Irish nationalist and 107 (5.4%) Ulster Protestants/loyalists.

Initially, the internees were housed with different paramilitary groups separated from each other, in Nissen huts at a disused RAF airfield that became the Long Kesh Detention Centre. The internees and their supporters agitated for improvements in their conditions and status; they saw themselves as political prisoners rather than common criminals. In July 1972, the Secretary of State for Northern Ireland, William Whitelaw introduced Special Category Status for those sentenced for crimes relating to the civil violence. There were 1,100 Special Category Status prisoners at that time.

Special Category Status for convicted paramilitary-linked prisoners gave them the same privileges previously available only to internees. These privileges included free association between prisoners, extra visits, food parcels, and the right to wear their own clothes rather than prison uniforms.

However, Special Category Status was short-lived. As part of a new British policy of "criminalisation" and coinciding with the end of internment, the new Secretary of State for Northern Ireland, Merlyn Rees, ended Special Category Status from 1 March 1976. Those convicted of "scheduled terrorist offences" after that date were housed in the eight new "H-Blocks" that had been constructed at Long Kesh, now officially named Her Majesty's Prison Maze. Existing prisoners remained in separate compounds and retained their Special Category Status with the last prisoner to hold this status being released in 1986. Some had their Special Category Status stripped away and were recategorized as common criminals. Brendan Hughes, an IRA prisoner, had been imprisoned with Special Category Status in Cage 11, but was alleged to have been involved in a fight with warders. Within a span of several hours he was taken to court, convicted, and placed in the H-Blocks as a common criminal.

== H-Blocks ==
Prisoners convicted of scheduled offences after 1 March 1976 were housed in the "H-Blocks" that had been newly constructed. Prisoners without Special Category Status began protesting for its return immediately after they were transferred to the H-Blocks. Their first act of defiance, initiated by Kieran Nugent, was to refuse to wear the prison uniforms, stating that convicted criminals, and not political prisoners, wear uniforms. Not allowed their own clothes, they wrapped themselves in bedsheets. Prisoners participating in the protest were "on the blanket". By 1978, more than 300 men had joined the protest. The British government refused to back down.

In March 1978, some prisoners refused to leave their cells to shower or use the lavatory because they were being beaten when they did, and were provided with wash-hand basins in their cells. Prisoners "on the blanket" reported that one of the things that caused the most stress was "...waiting for the moment the cell door would open and they would be dragged out, naked and defenseless, and then pounded into semi-consciousness before being thrown back in again".

Republican prisoners were also abused prior to and upon entering the Maze. Writing about the abuse of prisoners Queen's University Belfast professor Phil Scraton stated: "...it is evident they endured unacceptable levels of physical and psychological punishment, violence and violation. Administered purposefully, without the checks and balances of state institutional accountability, it constituted cruel, inhumane and degrading treatment/ punishment within the UN General Assembly's 1975 definition of torture." In 1978, the British government was found guilty and censured by the European Court of Human Rights for "cruel, inhuman, and degrading treatment in the interrogation procedures".

The prisoners requested that showers be installed in their cells; when this request was denied, they refused to use the wash-hand basins. At the end of April 1978, a fight occurred between a prisoner and a prison officer in H-Block 6. The prisoner was taken away to solitary confinement, and rumours spread across the wing that the prisoner had been badly beaten. The prisoners responded by smashing the furniture in their cells, causing the prison authorities to remove the remaining furniture from the cells, leaving only blankets and mattresses. The prisoners responded by refusing to leave their cells and, as a result, the prison officers were unable to clear them. This resulted in the blanket protest escalating into the dirty protest, as the prisoners would not leave their cells to "slop out" (i.e., empty their chamber pots), and started smearing excrement on the walls of their cells to "mitigate the spread of maggots".

=== Hunger strikes ===
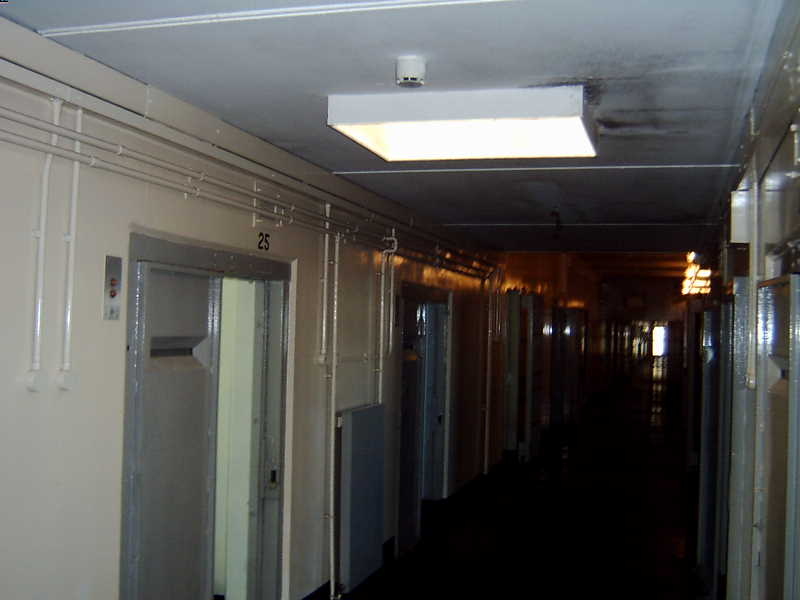
A view along the corridor of one of the wings of H4

Republicans outside the prison took the battle to the media and both sides fought for public support. Inside the prison, the prisoners took another step and organised a hunger strike.

On 27 October 1980, seven republican prisoners refused food and demanded political status. The Conservative government led by Margaret Thatcher did not initially give in. In December, the prisoners called off the hunger strike when the government appeared to concede to their demands. However, the government immediately reverted to their previous stance, in the belief that the prisoners would not start another strike. Bobby Sands, the leader of the Provisional IRA prisoners, began a second action on 1 March 1981. Outside the prison, in a major publicity coup, Sands was nominated for Parliament and won the Fermanagh and South Tyrone by-election. But the British government still resisted and on 5 May, after 66 days on hunger strike, Sands died. More than 100,000 people attended Sands's funeral in Belfast. Another nine hunger strikers (members of both the IRA and the INLA) died by the end of August before the hunger strike was called off in October.

=== Breakouts and attempted breakouts ===
On 25 September 1983, the Maze saw the biggest prison escape in British peacetime history. Thirty-eight prisoners hijacked a prison meals lorry and smashed their way out. During the breakout, four prison officers were stabbed. Officer James Ferris, stabbed three times, died from a heart attack. Another officer was shot in the head by Gerry Kelly, and several other officers were injured by the escapees. Nineteen of the prisoners were soon recaptured, but the other nineteen escaped.

In March 1997, an IRA escape attempt was foiled when a 40 ft (12 m) tunnel was found. The tunnel led from H-Block 7 and was 80 ft (24 m) short of the perimeter wall.

In December 1997, IRA prisoner Liam Averill escaped dressed as a woman during a Christmas party for prisoners' children. Averill, who was jailed for life after committing two murders, was not recaptured, and was instead given amnesty in early 2001 when he was one of a number of republican escapees to present themselves to the authorities in a two-week period.

=== Organisation ===
During the 1980s, the British government slowly introduced changes, granting what some would see as political status in all but name. Republican and loyalist prisoners were housed according to group. They organised themselves along military lines and exercised wide control over their respective H-Blocks. The Loyalist Volunteer Force (LVF) leader Billy Wright was shot dead in December 1997 by two Irish National Liberation Army (INLA) prisoners.

== Peace process ==
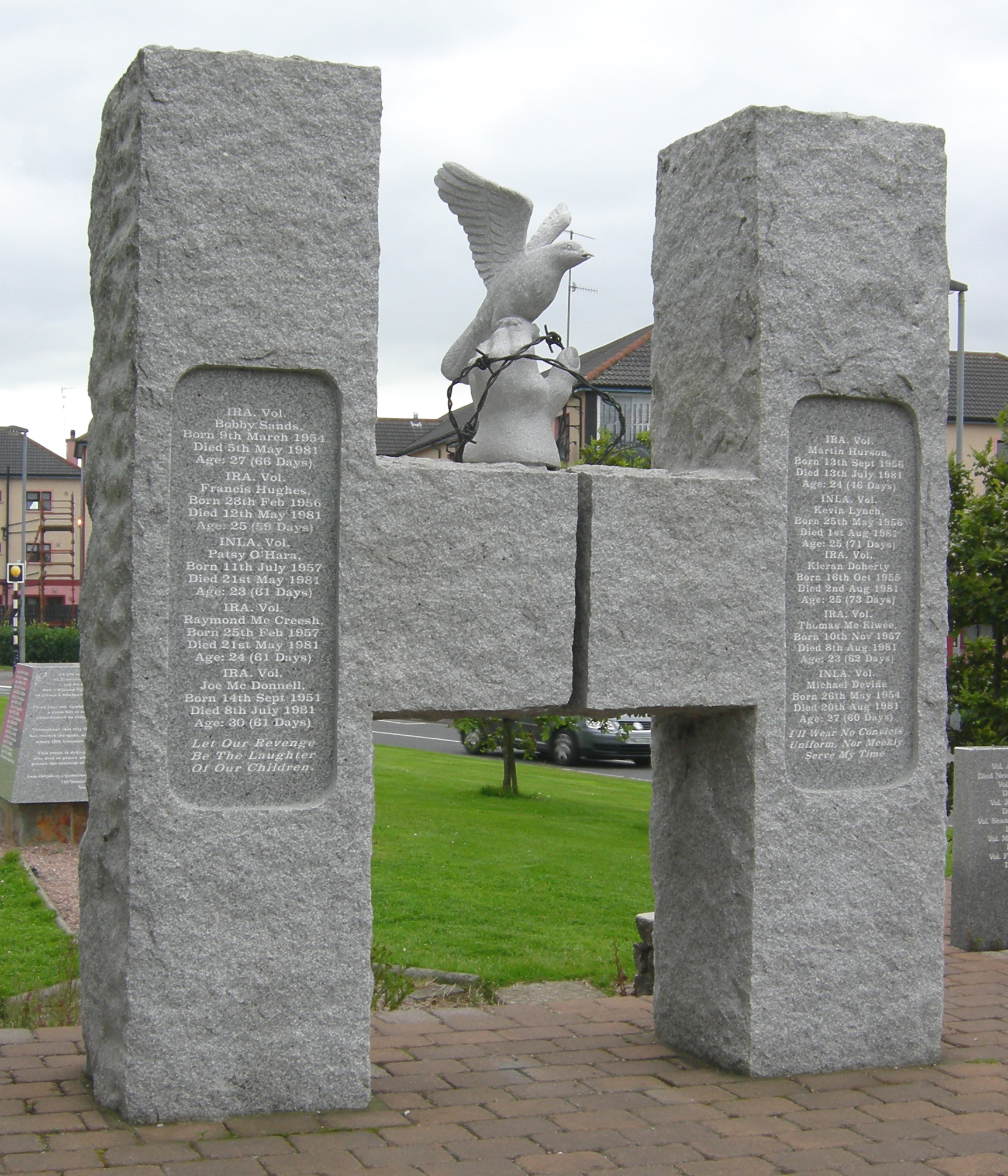
H-Block monument in the Bogside area of Derry; in memory of the 1981 hunger strikers who died at the prison.

The prisoners also played a significant role in the Northern Ireland peace process. On 9 January 1998, the British Secretary of State for Northern Ireland, Mo Mowlam, paid a surprise visit to the prison to talk to members of the Ulster Defence Association including Johnny Adair, Sam "Skelly" McCrory and Michael Stone. They had voted for their political representatives to pull out of talks. Shortly after Mowlam's visit, they changed their minds, allowing their representatives to continue talks that would lead to the Good Friday Agreement of 10 April 1998. Afterwards, the prison was emptied of its paramilitary prisoners as the groups they represented agreed to the ceasefire. In the two years following the agreement, 428 prisoners were released. On 29 September 2000, the remaining four prisoners at the Maze were transferred to other prisons in Northern Ireland and the Maze Prison was closed.

== Maze Long Kesh Development Corporation ==
A monitoring group was set up on 14 January 2003 to debate the future of the 360-acre (1.5 km^{2}) site. With close motorway and rail links, there were many proposals, including a museum, a multi-purpose sports stadium and an office, hotel and leisure village.

In January 2006, the government unveiled a masterplan for the site incorporating many of these proposals, including a 45,000 seat national multi-sport stadium for football, rugby and Gaelic games. The government's infrastructure organisation, the Strategic Investment Board (SIB), was tasked with the proposed stadium, appointing one of its senior advisers, Tony Whitehead, to manage the project. The capacity of the proposed stadium was later adjusted to first 35,000 and then 38,000 and the organising bodies of all three sports – Irish FA, Ulster Rugby and Ulster GAA – agreed in principle to support the integrated scheme. In October 2006, demolition work began in preparation for construction.

In January 2009, plans to build the new multi-purpose stadium on the site of the prison were cancelled. Gregory Campbell, the Minister of Culture, Arts and Leisure, cited a lack of support and concerns for a net loss to the economy.

Discussion is still ongoing as to the listed status of sections of the old prison. The hospital and part of the H-Blocks are currently listed buildings, and would remain as part of the proposed site redevelopment as a "conflict transformation centre" with support from republicans such as Martin McGuinness and opposition from unionists worried it may become "a shrine to the IRA".

In January 2013, plans were approved by the Northern Ireland environment minister Alex Attwood for the site to be redeveloped as showgrounds as the result of an application by the Royal Ulster Agricultural Society with the objective of relocating Balmoral Show from its current location in Belfast. The site is now known as Balmoral Park.

In October 2019, the European Union withdrew £18m that had been approved to develop a peace centre, due to disagreements between Sinn Féin and the Democratic Unionist Party.

In April 2020, the former prison was reportedly under consideration for conversion into a temporary hospital during the COVID-19 pandemic.

In 2025, it was revealed that the regeneration project would be limited to "health and safety".
