= Athanasios Ktorides Foundation =

Cypriot non-profit philanthropic organization

- Formation: 2008
- Founder: Nasos Ktorides
- Founded at: Nicosia, Cyprus
- Type: Charitable organization
- Purpose: Charitable activities Children; Greek culture Scholarships; Organizer of Nicosia Marathon
- Headquarters: Nicosia, Cyprus
- Region served: Global
- Website: www.ktoridesfoundation.org

Athanasios Ktorides Foundation is a non-profit philanthropic organisation founded in 2008 by Nasos Ktorides, the first Cyprus Goodwill Ambassador for UNICEF. The Foundation promotes sport and culture with humanitarian work. It is organizer of the Quantum Nicosia Marathon in 2010, 2012 and 2018. It collects and publishes books, academic research and studies. The Foundation supports Cypriot and Greek cultural heritage. It also sponsors charity activities that benefit families and children with special needs, as well as orphans and children's shelters, and all other activities aimed at the protection and well-being of children. The Foundation grants 10 full scholarships for studies in leading European and American universities for 2018—2019.

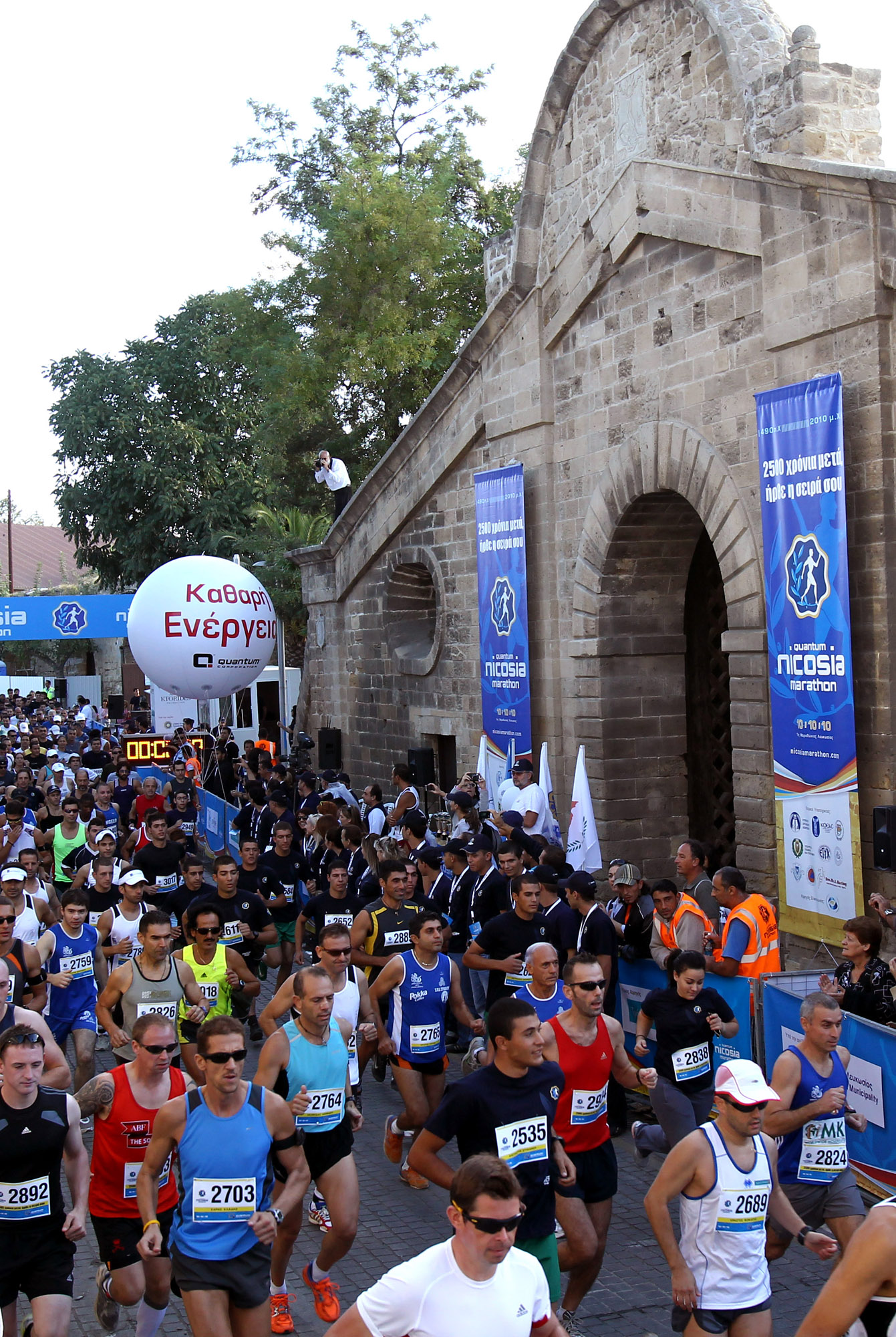
Quantum Nicosia Marathon 2010

== Activities ==
=== Sport and humanitarian activity ===
The Athanasios Ktorides Foundation was founded 2008 by its current chairman Nasos Ktorides, the first Cyprus Goodwill Ambassador for UNICEF. The Foundation promotes and sponsors cultural and sport activities and activities aimed at the protection and well-being of children. The Nicosia Marathon was established in 2010 by the Foundation to commemorate 2500 years from the Battle of Marathon. It was decided that 50% of revenue from entries in the Quantum Nicosia Marathon to be given to the objective of "My Venerable Friends", that is to the welfare of elders. More than 7,000 runners took part in the 2012 Nicosia Marathon, also sponsored by the Foundation. Simultaneously with the marathon, the Foundation also organised the "Winner's Fair" with many different activities. All proceeds are donated to the Cyprus Anti-Cancer Society.

From the marathon participations' revenue, the Foundation also supported the charitable institutions "One Dream One Wish", The Cyprus Institute of Neurology and Genetics, the Association of Parents and Friends of Children with Heart Disease and UNICEF. In 2012, the Foundation sponsored the 2012 Parachuting Festival. In 2018, the Foundation also sponsored 7th Quantum Klirou Atovrisi Challenge, organized as 4 km and 12 km races.

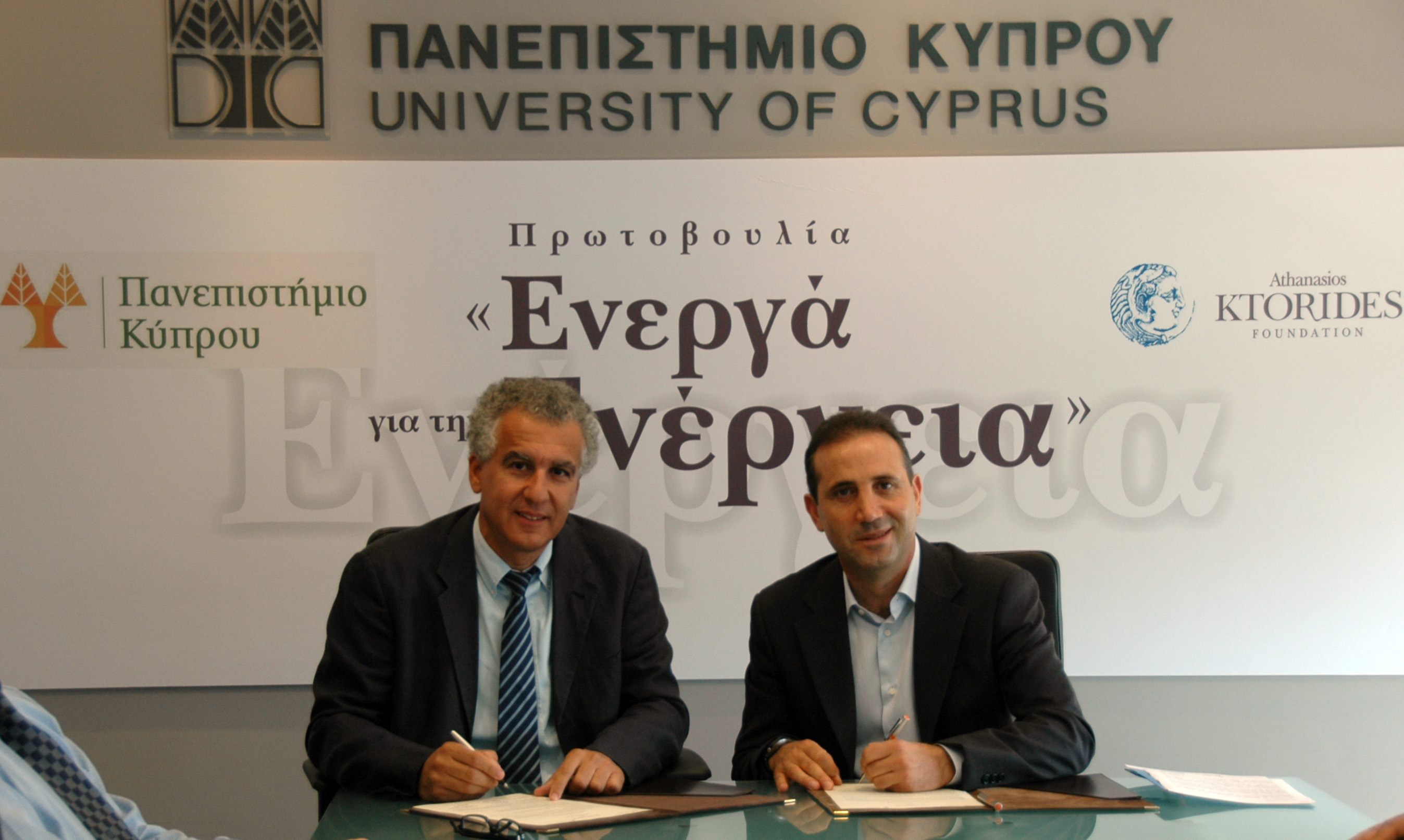
Rector of the University of Cyprus Constantinos Christofides and the President of Ktorides Foundation Nasos Ktorides signing cooperation agreement

=== Ktorides Fellowship and Action For Energy ===
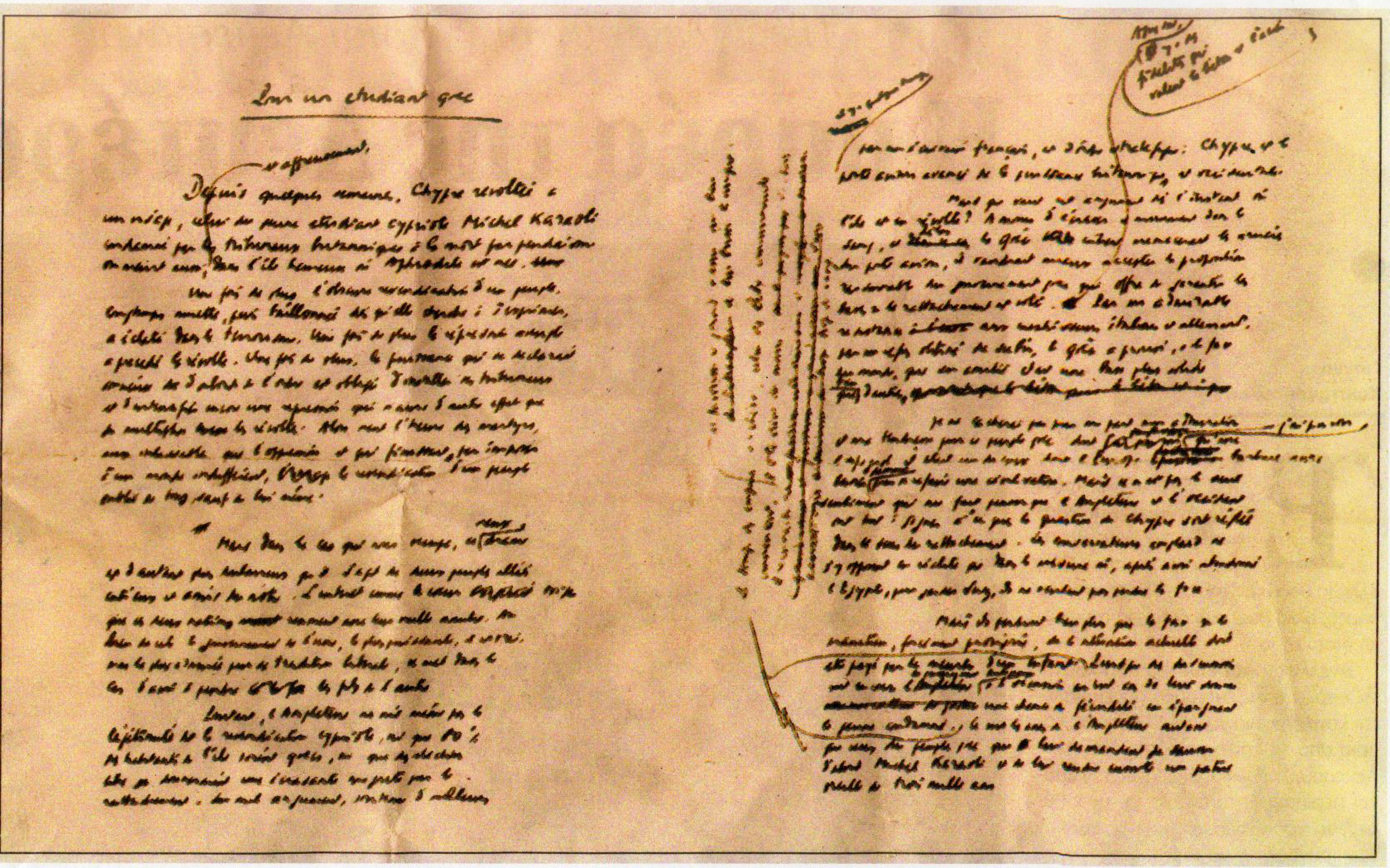
Albert Camus appealed to Queen Elizabeth for Michalis Karaolis

In 2011, a cooperation agreement was signed between the Foundation and the University of Cyprus in a joint initiative Action for Energy. The Foundation offered scholarships entitled The Athanasios Ktorides Foundation Scholarship to PhD students whose research was in the field of solar energy. In order to preserve Cyprus nature, the Foundation also supported tree-planting in 2017.

The Athanasios Ktorides Foundation grants 10 full scholarships for studies in leading European and American universities for 2018—2019.

=== Cultural activity ===
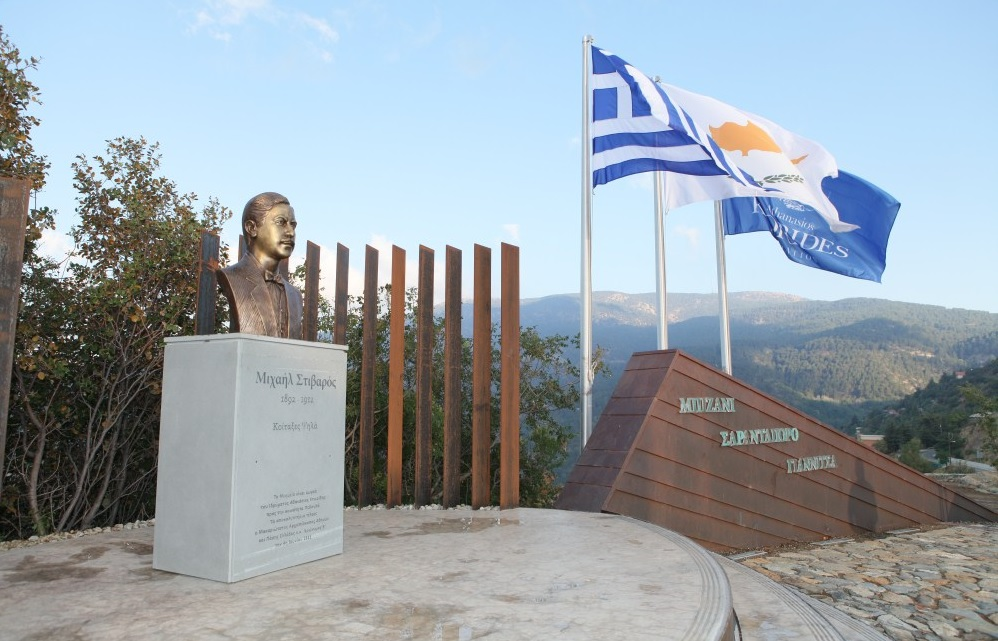
Monument to Michalis Stivaros and the Balkan Wars

The Foundation erected a monument in 2011 dedicated to Michalis Stivaros, one of the heroes of the First Balkan War. On a mountain top overlooking Pedoulas, the monument is erected as a symbol of the heroism of all Cypriots who fought in the Balkan Wars. Stivaros died in December 1912 in prelude of the Battle of Bizani, fighting for the liberation of Epirus from the Turks. The Foundation erected and unveiled bust of Michalis Stivaros on 28 October 2013 in Ioannina.

The Foundation has made significant contributions to the arts by securing and repatriating historically important documents and other literary works. On 50th anniversary of the execution of Michalis Karaolis, Nasos Ktorides acquired from auction and donated to the National Struggle Museum in Nicosia a handwritten manuscript by Nobel laureate and philosopher, Albert Camus. Albert Camus in his letter to Queen Elizabeth II appealed for mercy for the Michalis Karaolis, freedom fighter of the EOKA struggle for independence. The presentation and publication of some important books are also supported by the Foundation.

On May 25, 2018 Rector of the Sorbonne University, byzantinologist and UNICEF ambassador Eleni Glykatzi-Arveler in collaboration with the Athanasios Ktorides Foundation presented lecture on the historic subject The Past Has s Future.

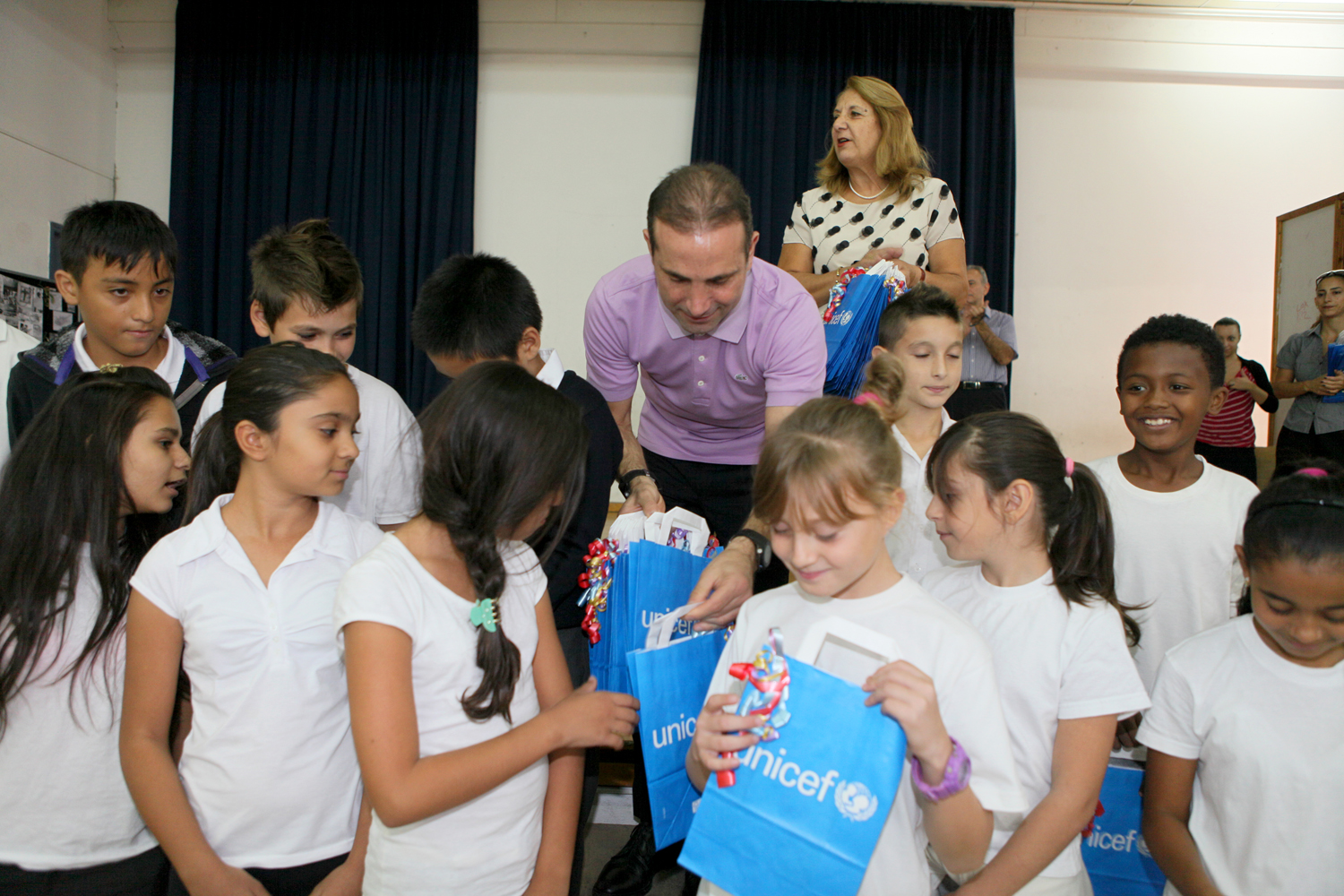
UNICEF Goodwill Ambassador Nasos Ktorides with children

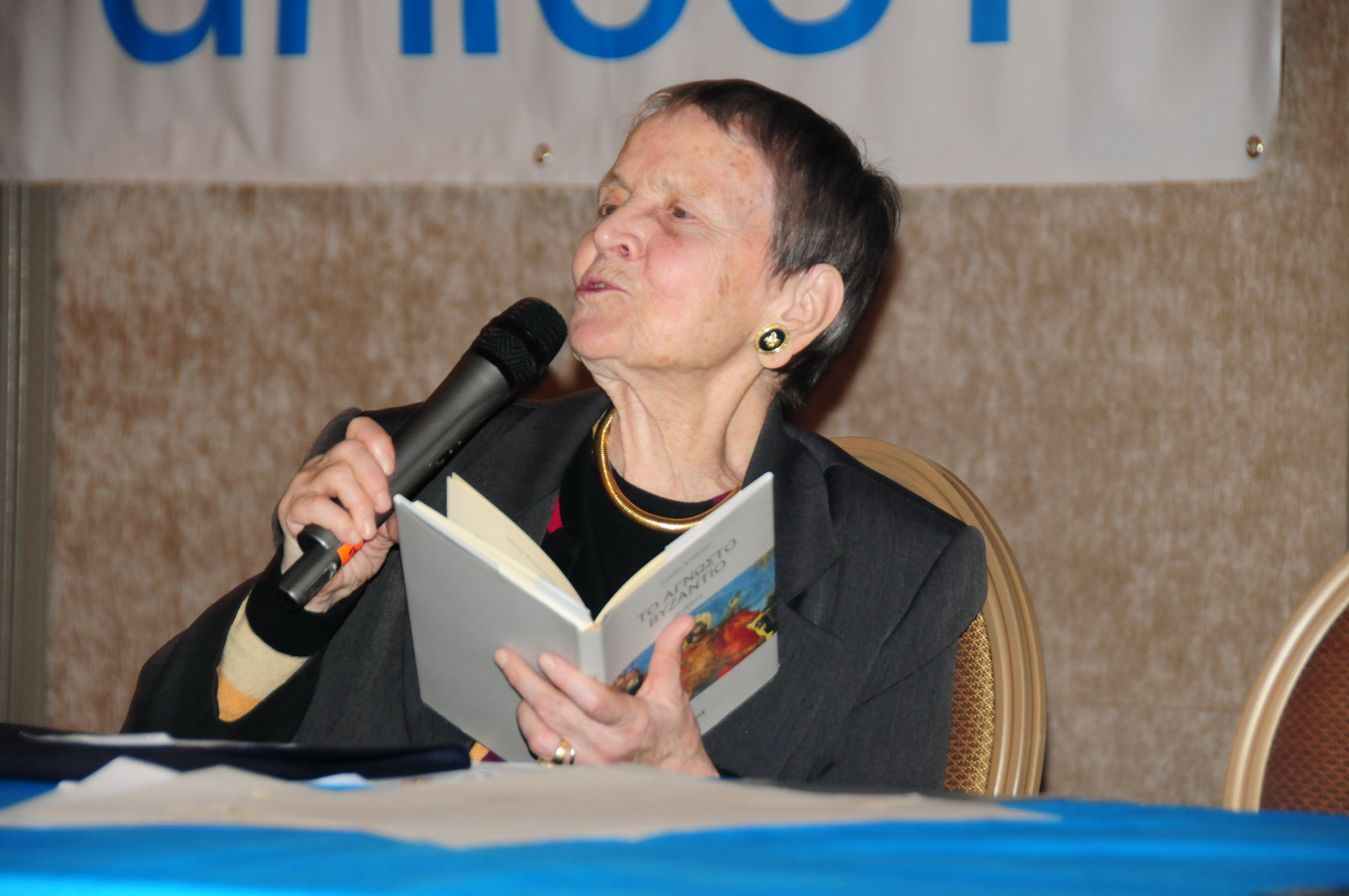
UNICEF ambassador Eleni Glykatzi-Arveler

=== Children ===
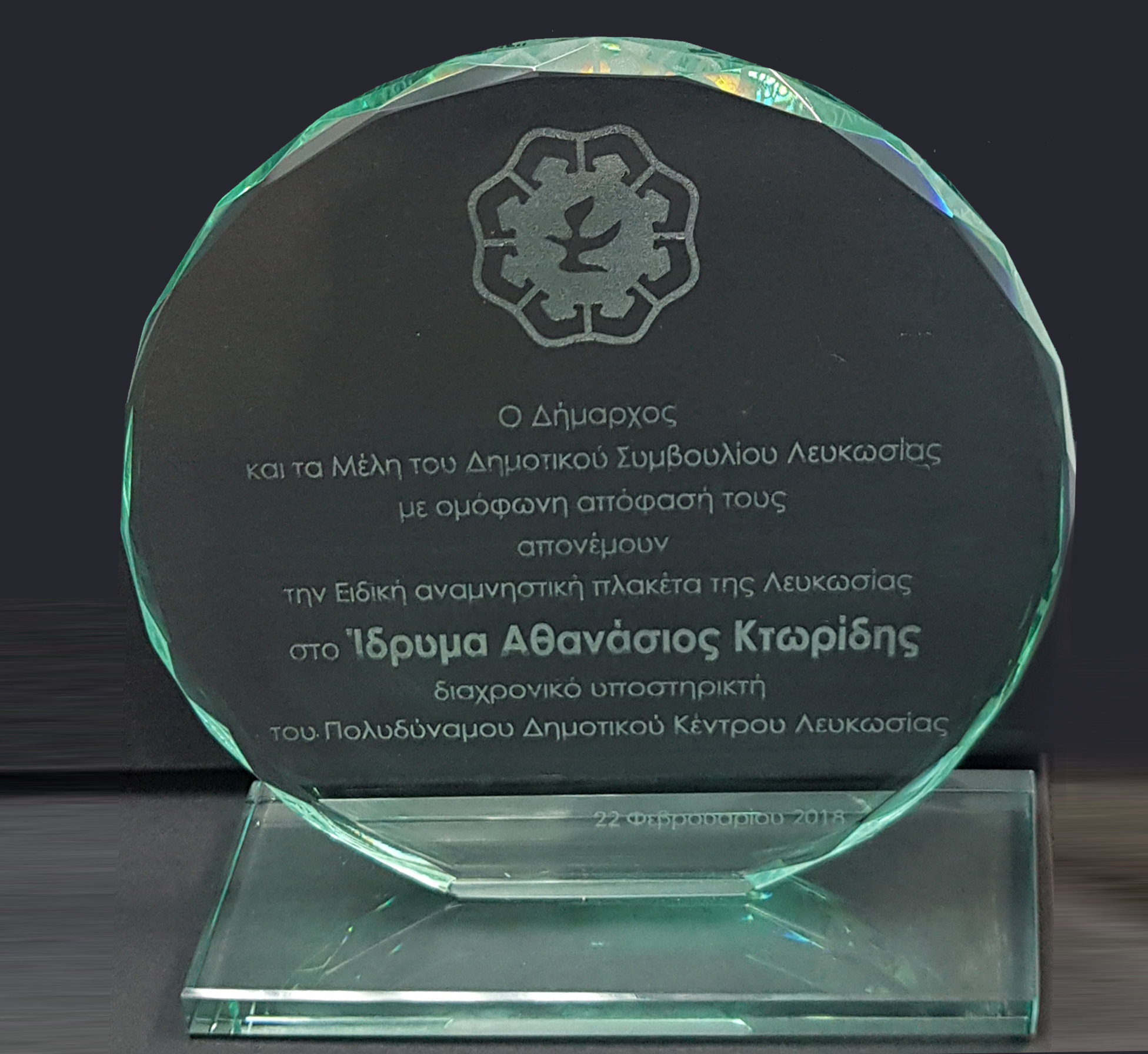
Nicosia Special Honorary Award for Foundation

The Foundation has sponsored the publication of children's books with all revenues from their sale donated to UNICEF. UNICEF declared Nasos Ktorides as a National Goodwill Ambassador for UNICEF. He is the first Cyprus Goodwill Ambassador for UNICEF and the third in the wider Hellenic world.

Children are regularly invited to different activities organized by the Foundation. Many charities and children ceremonies are sponsored or held under the Foundation's auspices. In organization of Foundation children from Pediatric-Oncology unit spent time on Ktorides Estate. Rector of the Sorbonne University and UNICEF ambassador Eleni Glykatzi-Arveler was guest several times on charity events organized by the Athanasios Ktoridis Foundation. Foundation sponsors charity activities that benefit families and children with special needs, as well as orphans and children's shelters, and all other activities aimed at the protection and well-being of children.

The Foundation donated clothes for hundreds of children in the Commonwealth of Dominica. This was not the first aid sent to children in the Commonwealth of Dominica, assistance that continues to date. In 2009, the humanitarian sensitivity was recognized by the Commonwealth of Dominica and Nasos Ktorides was inducted as Honorary Consul of the country in Cyprus. The Prime Minister of Dominica awarded Ktorides the "Dominica Medal of Honor", as well as a diplomatic passport of the Caribbean nation.

== Special honorary award ==
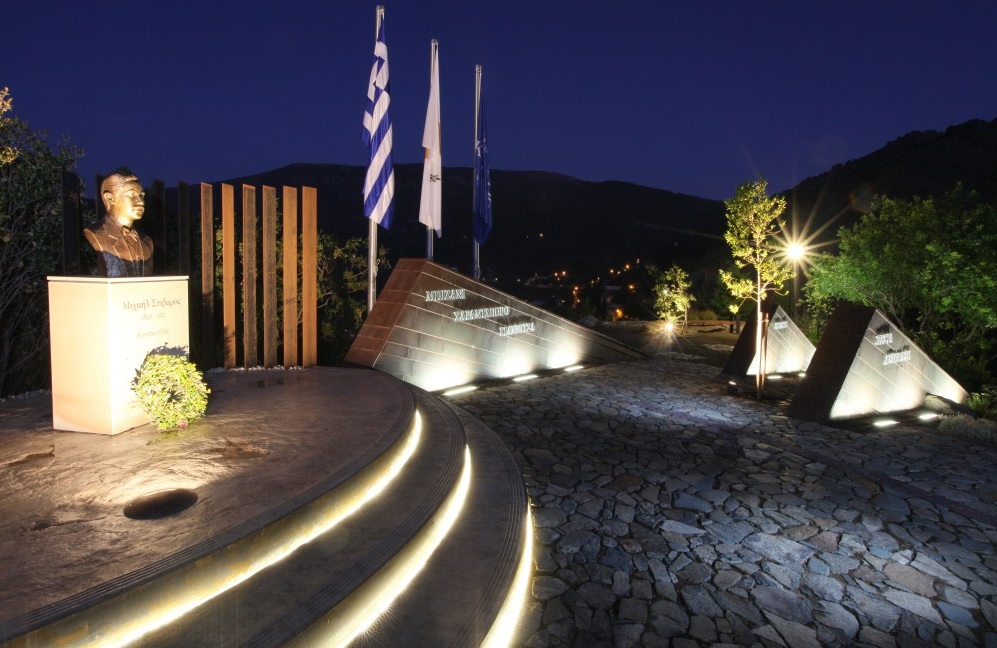
Monument to Michalis Stivaros and the Balkan Wars at night

Nicosia Municipality awarded the Athanasios Ktorides Foundation with a Special Honorary Award on February 22, 2018 in Nicosia.
