= Nasos Ktorides =

Cypriot entrepreneur and philanthropist

Athanasios "Nasos" Ktorides Αθανάσιος "Νάσος" Κτωρίδης
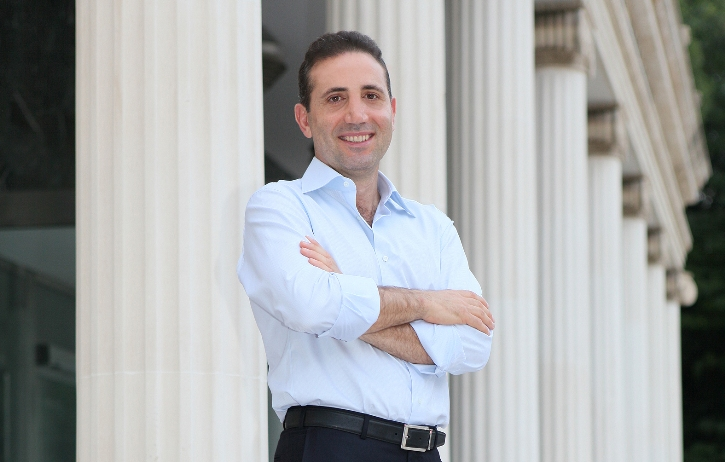
- Born: 10 November 1968; Nicosia, Cyprus
- Known for: First Cyprus UNICEF Ambassador; Executive Vice-Chairman of Commercial Bank of Greece in Cyprus; CEO of EuroAsia Interconnector; CEO of EuroAfrica Interconnector; CEO of Quantum Cable; CEO of Quantum Energy Group
- Board member of: Chairman of Ktorides Foundation founder of Nicosia Marathon

Athanasios "Nasos" Ktorides (Greek: Αθανάσιος "Νάσος" Κτωρίδης; born 10 November 1968) is a Cypriot entrepreneur and philanthropist, founding Chairman and former CEO of the EuroAsia Interconnector electricity cable, Quantum Corporation, Quantum Energy, Quantum Cable and EuroAfrica Interconnector. He is the first Cyprus Goodwill Ambassador for UNICEF.

== Life and work ==
Athanasios "Nasos" Ktorides was born on 10 November 1968 in Nicosia, Cyprus. He studied at the American College of Greece in Athens and attended the Harvard Executive Leadership Programme in 2007 (now Harvard Professional Development Programme).

Ktorides's activities extend primarily beyond Cyprus and embrace the sectors of energy and banking. His company Quantum was instrumental in the establishment of the Commercial Bank of Greece in Cyprus, in which it was the second biggest shareholder after the Hellenic Republic. Quantum's Chairman, Mr. Athanasios Ktorides, also acted as the bank's Executive Vice Chairman for a period of 7 years.

He is also involved in electricity generation with five power plants of installed capacity 1422 MW connected to the Pan-European electric network. He has been actively working towards the strategic upgrade of Cyprus in the international energy arena, the key projects being the EuroAsia Interconnector and EuroAfrica Interconnector, eastern Mediterranean sub-sea electricity cables. The EuroAsia Interconnector will link Israel with Cypriot and Greek power grids with high-voltage direct current submarine power cable of length around 1,208-kilometre (751 mi) . It will have a capacity to transmit 2,000 megawatts of electricity in either direction. EuroAfrica Interconnector will link Egypt with Cypriot and Greek power grids through the island of Crete with high-voltage direct current submarine power cable of length around 1707 km.

== Philanthropy ==
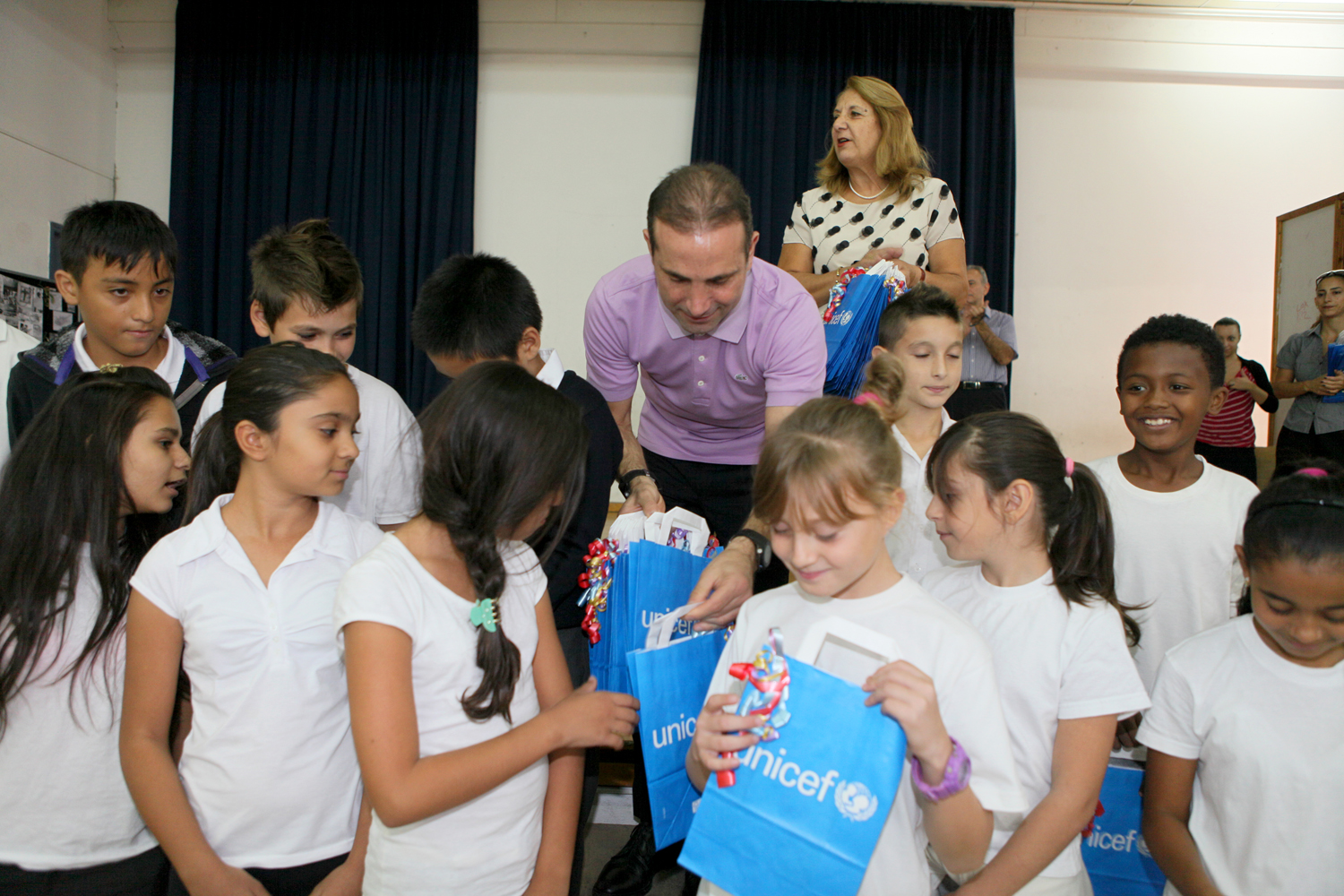
UNICEF Goodwill Ambassador Nasos Ktorides with children

In 2008, Ktorides established a not-for-profit, philanthropic fund, the Athanasios Ktorides Foundation. The Foundation grants 10 full scholarships for studies in leading European and American universities for 2018—2019. The Foundation was also the main organizer of the Quantum Nicosia Marathon in 2010 and has made significant contribution to the arts, most importantly to secure and repatriate historically important documents and other works. It sponsors charity activities that benefit families, children with special needs, orphans, children's shelters, and all other activities aimed at the protection and well-being of children. In 2009, his business scope and humanitarian sensibility was recognized by the Commonwealth of Dominica as the ideal credentials for the post as Honorary Consul of the country in Cyprus. The Prime Minister of Dominica awarded him the "Dominica Medal of Honor", as well as the diplomatic passport of the country.

Four international personalities, the President of the Republic of Serbia, the Prime Minister of the Commonwealth of Dominica, the President of the Republic of Cyprus Glafkos Clerides and the Archbishop of Athens and All Greece Ieronymos II of Athens, called upon UNICEF to use the good offices of Nasos Ktorides.

On February 8, 2012, UNICEF declared Nasos Ktorides as National Goodwill Ambassador who, together with author Antonis Samarakis and principal of the Panthéon-Sorbonne University and rector of the Academy of Paris Eleni Glykatzi-Arveler, completes the trio of personalities of the wider Hellenic world who have enjoyed such recognition to date.

=== Albert Camus' letter ===
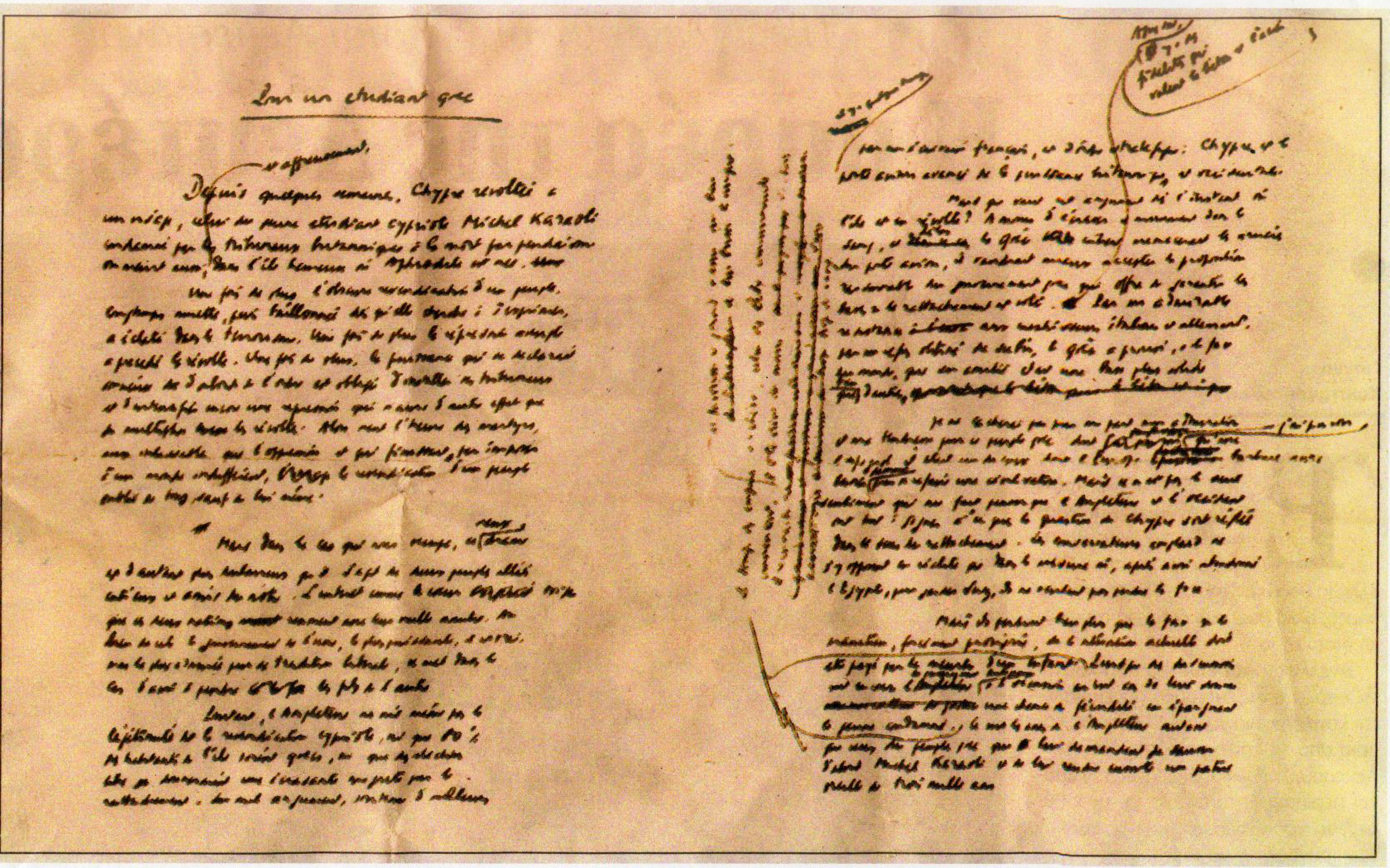
Albert Camus appealed to Queen Elizabeth for Michalis Karaolis

Marking the 50th anniversary of the execution of Michalis Karaolis on May 10, 1956, a handwritten manuscript by the philhellene Nobel laureate and philosopher, Albert Camus, appealing to Queen Elizabeth II for mercy for the young Greek Cypriot freedom fighter of the 1955-59 EOKA struggle for independence, was acquired from auction by Nasos Ktorides and donated to the National Struggle Museum in Nicosia. In a letter of appreciation in June 2006, President Tassos Papadopoulos praised the benefactor.

Karaolis, just 22 years old at the time, was credited with the execution on August 28, 1955, of a police officer, member of the Special Branch who had infiltrated the EOKA movement. On his way to rejoin the guerrillas headed by Grigoris Afxentiou in the Kyrenia mountains, Karaolis was captured and sentenced to death on October 28. He was hanged at the Central Prisons on May 10, 1956, together with Andreas Dimitriou, the first heroes of the independence struggle.

== Marathon and sport ==
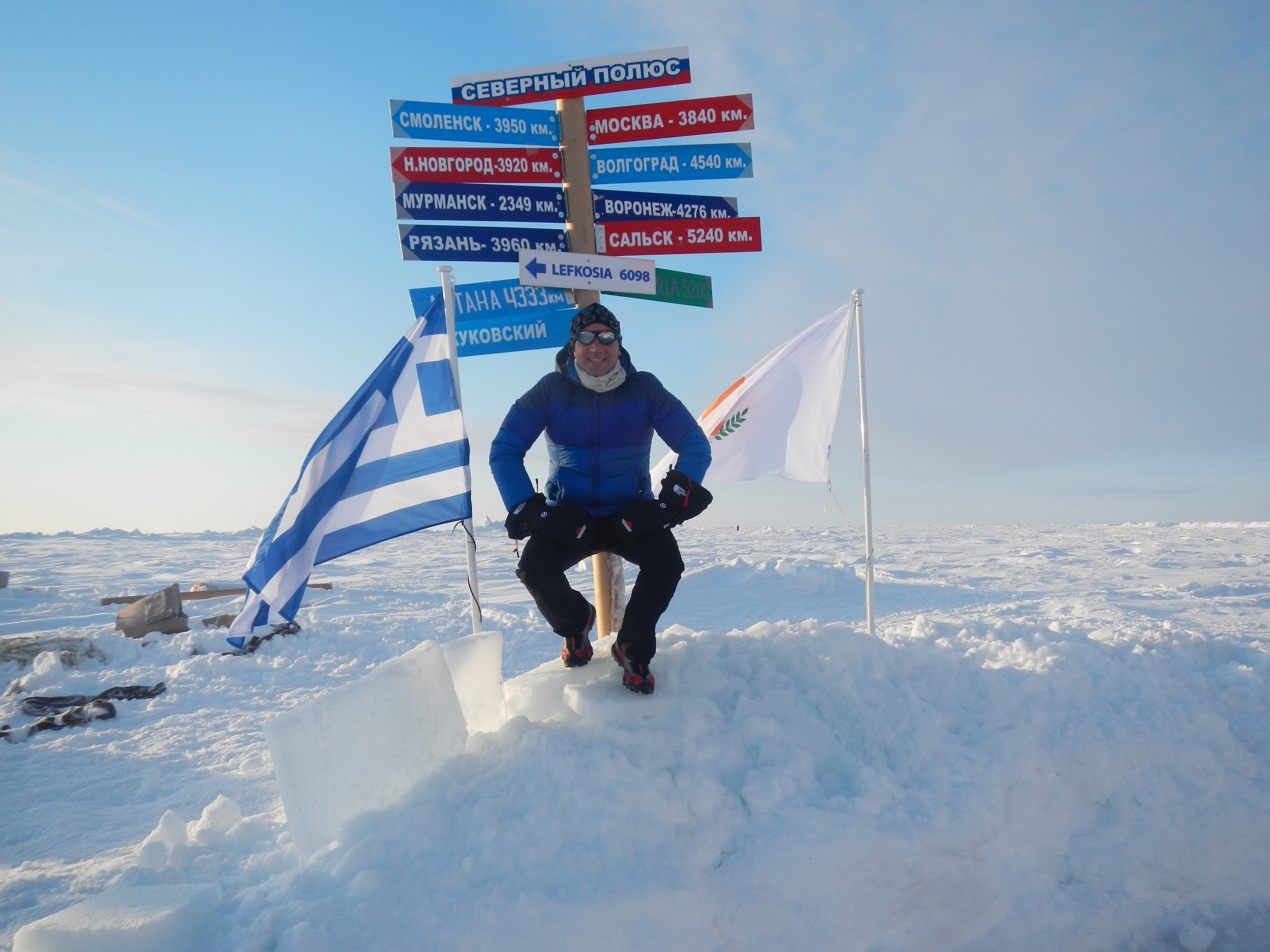
Athanasios (Nasos) Ktorides on North Pole during Polar marathon 2012

Nasos has participated in marathon events since 2008, participating among others in the Athens and Boston Marathons, as well as in the North Pole and Antarctic Ice Marathon. North Pole Marathon is recognized as the northernmost marathon on earth and until now only several hundred people participated. Nasos Ktorides in 2012 brought the Marathon Flame for first time to Antarctic Ice Marathon. He is founder of Quantum Nicosia Marathon in 2010. He is also a freefall skydiver and wingsuit pilot trained in Russia, and a member of both the British Parachute Association and the U.S. Parachute Association.

== Literature ==
- Honorable speaker at the Graduation Ceremony
- Biography from Vice-rector of University of Cyprus
- Honorable speaker N. Ktorides
- Athanasios Ktorides Foundation.
- EuroAsia Interconnector
