= Nicosia Marathon =

International marathon through Nicosia, Cyprus

- Date: December 8, 2024
- Location: Nicosia, Cyprus, EU
- Event type: Road
- Distance: Marathon and half marathon
- Primary sponsor: Quantum Energy; EuroAsia Interconnector
- Established: 2010
- Organizer: Athanasios Ktorides Foundation
- Website: www.nicosiamarathon.com

Nicosia Marathon (branded The Quantum Nicosia Marathon) is an international marathon (42.195 km) that courses through Nicosia. Its inaugural run was held on October 10, 2010. as a half-marathon race. It was founded in 2010. by the Athanasios Ktorides Foundation to commemorate 2,500 years of Battle of Marathon. The course begins at the Famagusta Gate, the chief gate of old Nicosia walls, and comes back.

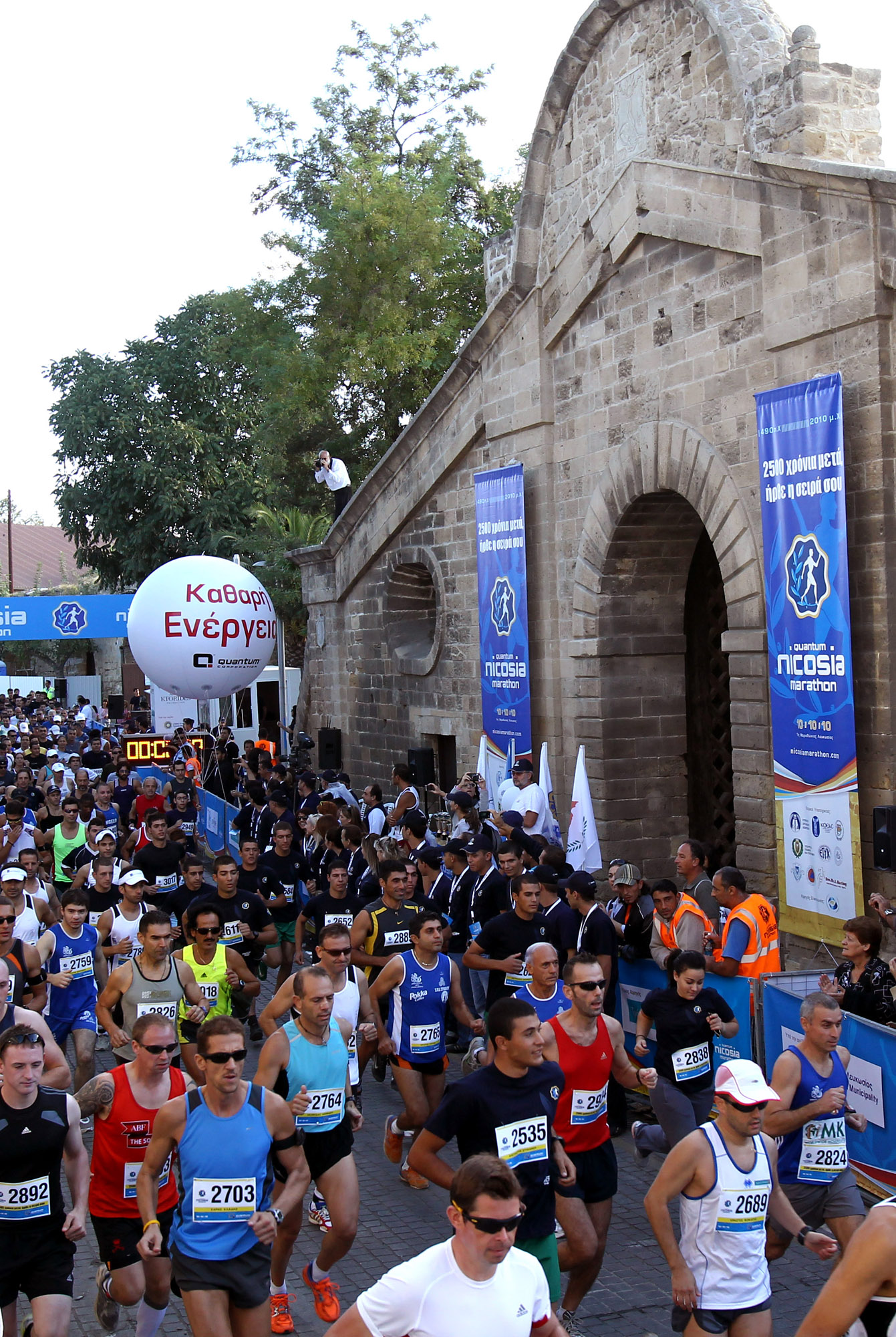
Start of Quantum Nicosia Marathon 2010

== Description ==
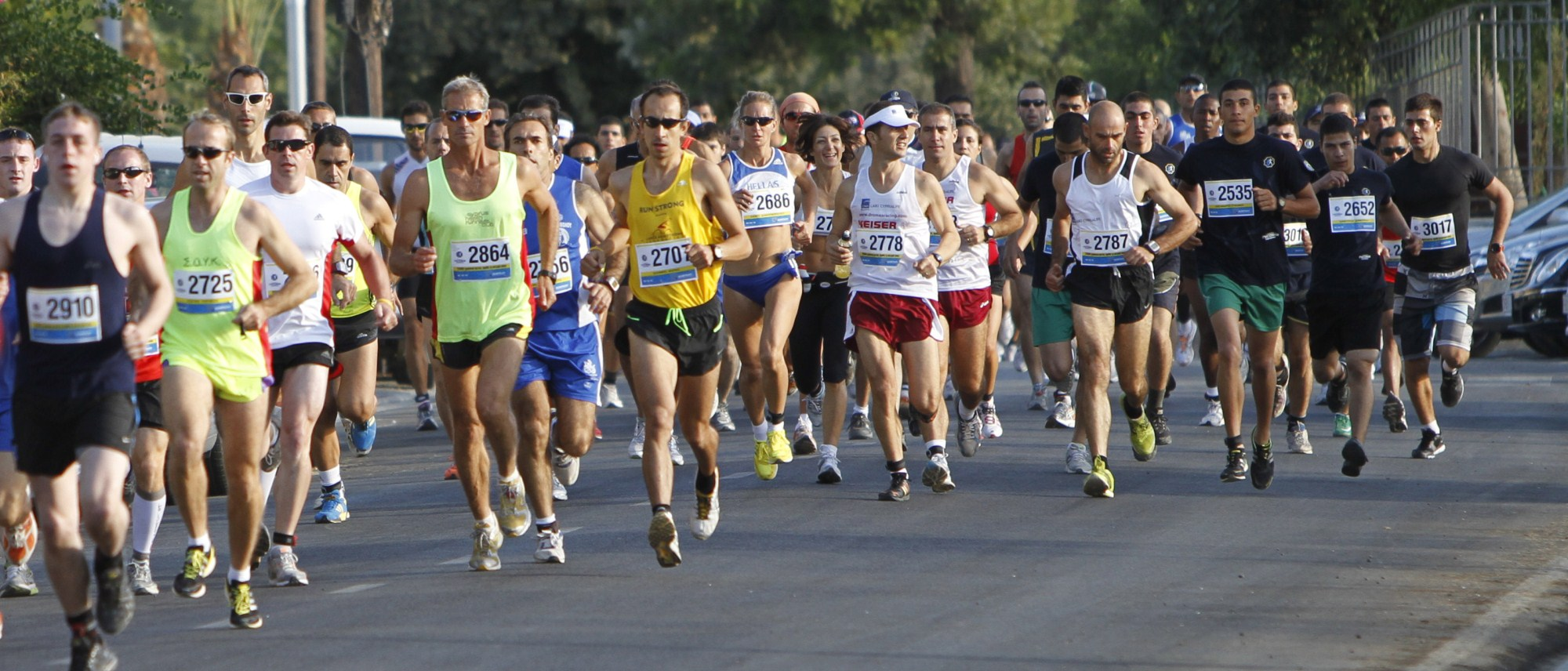

The Quantum Nicosia Marathon is organized and founded by the Athanasios Ktorides Foundation. It is branded as Quantum Nicosia Marathon after name of its main sponsor Quantum Energy. First Quantum marathon took place in Nicosia, Cyprus on October 10, 2010. as a half marathon and 4.6 km race. It was organized just 2,500 years after Battle of Marathon, which took place in 490 BC. More than 5,000 runners participated in first marathon race in Nicosia. Winner of first marathon race in 2010 was Konstantinos Poulios with time 1:06:31.

The next marathon was organized on December 9, 2012; on that date, a marathon, a half marathon, a 10 km run, a 5 km run and a 1 km UNICEF Charity run took place. More than seven thousand runners participated in the Quantum Nicosia Marathon. Marathon took place on streets of Nicosia. Start and finish of race was at the Famagusta Gate, chief gate of old Nicosia walls. The Quantum Nicosia Marathon course is of a low degree of difficulty. The Marathon flame arrived for first time on Cyprus on December 6, 2012, just 3 days before start of the Quantum Nicosia Marathon. Nasos Ktorides had honour to bring the Marathon Flame first to the Antarctic Ice Marathon and then to Cyprus.

At Athalassa park in Nicosia on December 2, 2018, a 7.7 km race in honour of Cypriot Marathon runner Stelios Kyriakides was organized; Kynakides had won the Boston Marathon in 1946. Race distance symbolically represents Kyriakides jersey number 77 during his winning Boston race.

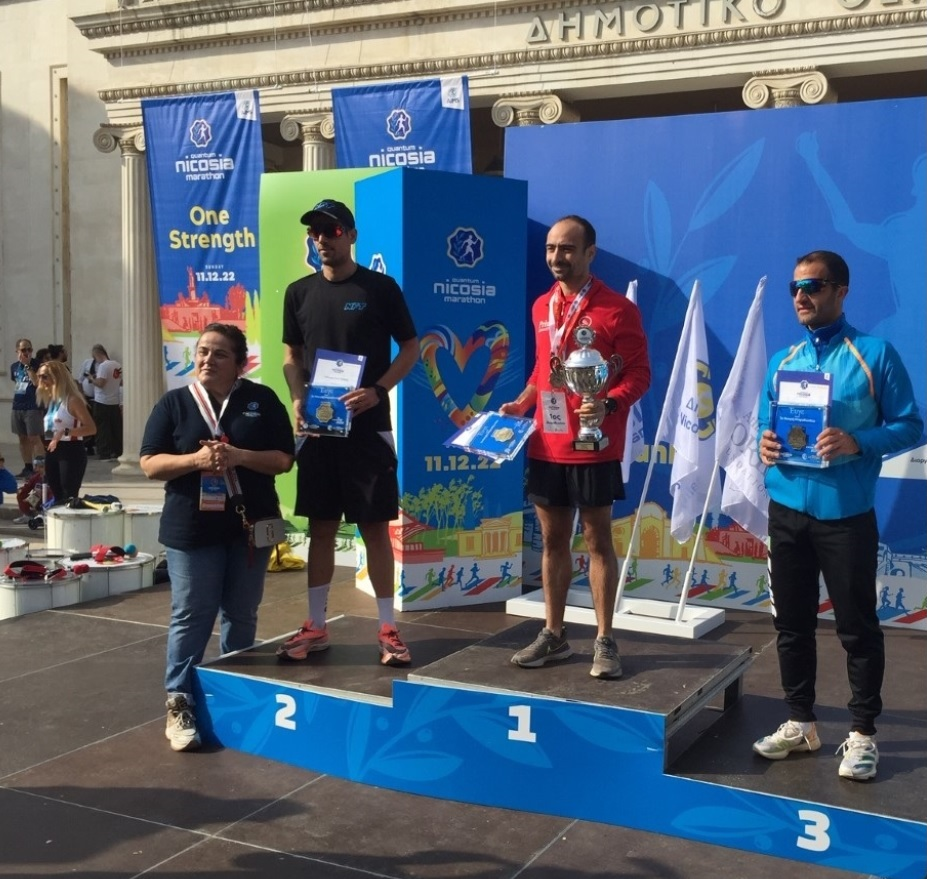
Winners of the Quantum Nicosia Marathon 2022, men

Despite the Covid-19 restrictions, the “Quantum Nicosia Marathon 2021” included the Half Marathon, the “Stelios Kyriakides 7.7 miles”, the 5K Race and the sMile Run.

On December 11, 2022, the races for the “Quantum Nicosia Marathon 2022” included the Marathon and Half Marathon (starting from University of Cyprus Library), and the “Stelios Kyriakides 7.7 miles”, the 5K Race and the Quantum sMile Run, start and finish at the Nicosia Municipal Theatre. Yiorgos Harakis from Cyprus and Anna Kawalec from Poland were winners of the «Quantum Nicosia Marathon 2022. All the funds from the participation fees are donated to the Little Heroes, the Parents and Friends of Children with Heart Disease, the Alkinoos Artemiou Foundation, Autism Cyprus, Mothers and Relatives of National Guard PEMSE and the Nicosia Municipal Multipurpose Community Centre.

== Accreditation ==
The marathon is recognized by the Association of International Marathons and Distance Races and the International Association of Athletics Federations. Roads are officially closed to traffic throughout the entire length of the race and medical support is offered along the race course.

== Participation ==
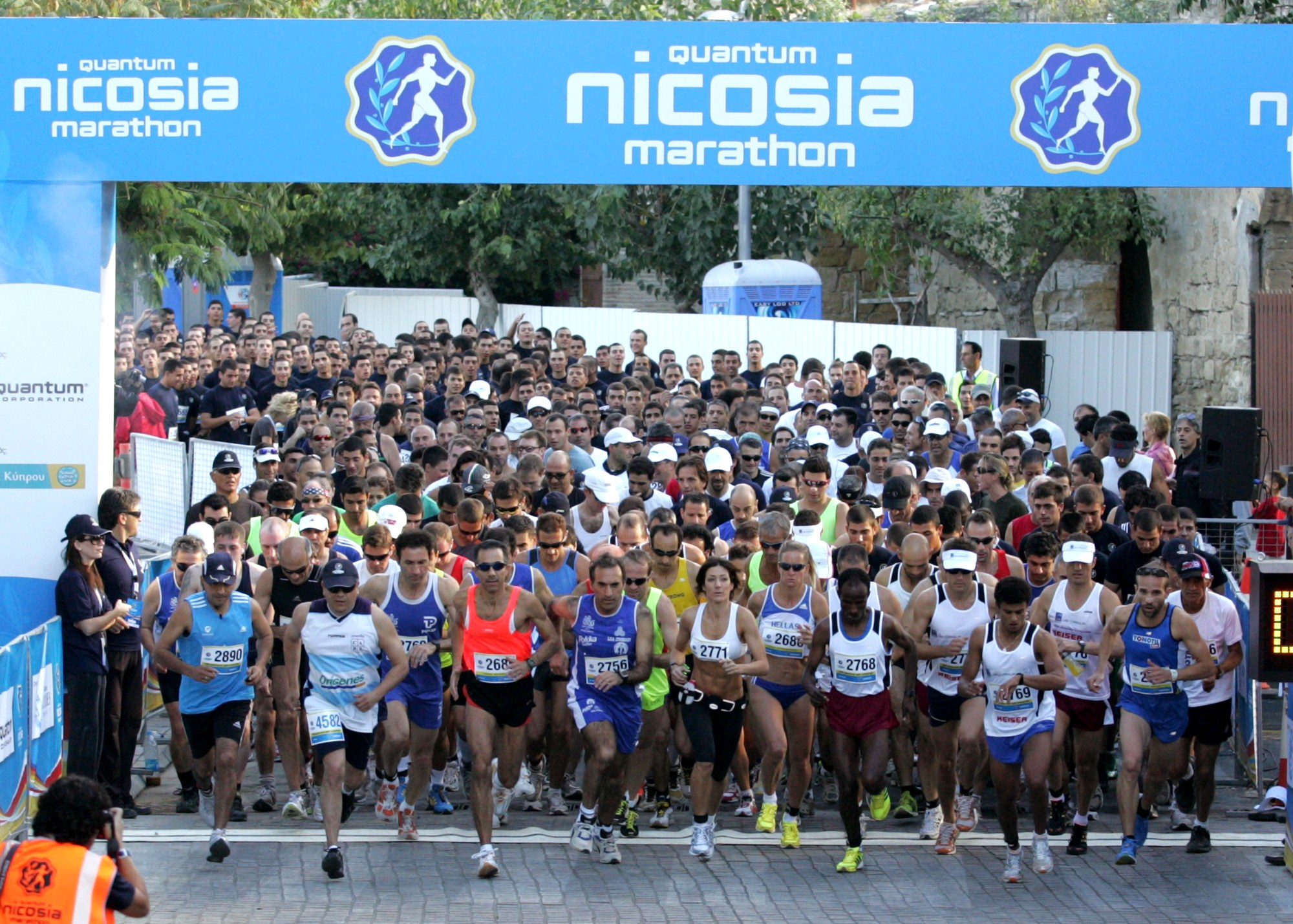
Start of Nicosia Marathon 2010

Runners are mostly European but participation from Brazil, United States, Australia, Japan, Ethiopia, China and Turkey are very common.

The oldest runner was Cypriot Andreas Pampakas, aged 76 with children as young as 4 years old participating as well.

The Athanasios Ktorides Foundation simultaneously with the marathon organized “Winner’s Fair” with many different activities. All proceeds are donated to the Cyprus Anti-Cancer Society. The Foundation also from the marathon participations' revenue supported the charitable institutions “One Dream One Wish", The Cyprus Institute of Neurology and Genetics, the Association of Parents and Friends of Children with Heart Disease and UNICEF.

== Results ==
Key:

2012: marathon
2010 & 2021: half marathon
2018 & 2019: 7.7km

Edition	Year	Men's winner	Time (h:m:s)	Women's winner	Time (h:m:s)
—	2010	Konstantinos Poulios (GRE)	1:06:31		
—	2011				
1st	2012	Dimitris Vogiatzis (GRE)	2:44:07	Amelie Willemot (FRA)	3:24:51
—	2013–2017 were not held.				
—	2018	Apollon Kapodistrias (CYP)	32:06	Natalia Charalambous (CYP)	32:58
—	2019	Christoforos Protopapas (CYP)	26:46	Christina Kourri (CYP)	33:49
—	2020	not held			
—	2021	Avraamis Avraam (CYP)	1:16:44	Stavri Pericleous (CYP)	01:28:28
—	2022	Georgios Harakis (CYP)	2:44:27	Anna Kawalec (POL)	3:21:03
—	2023	Pavel Borodin (RUS)	2:37:38	Joanna Maria Drewnicka Ogrodnik (POL)	3:11:08
—	2024	Neacsu Cristian Alexandru (ROM)	2:36:03	Zurman Maja (SLO)	2:58:27

== List of winners of 2012 Marathon ==
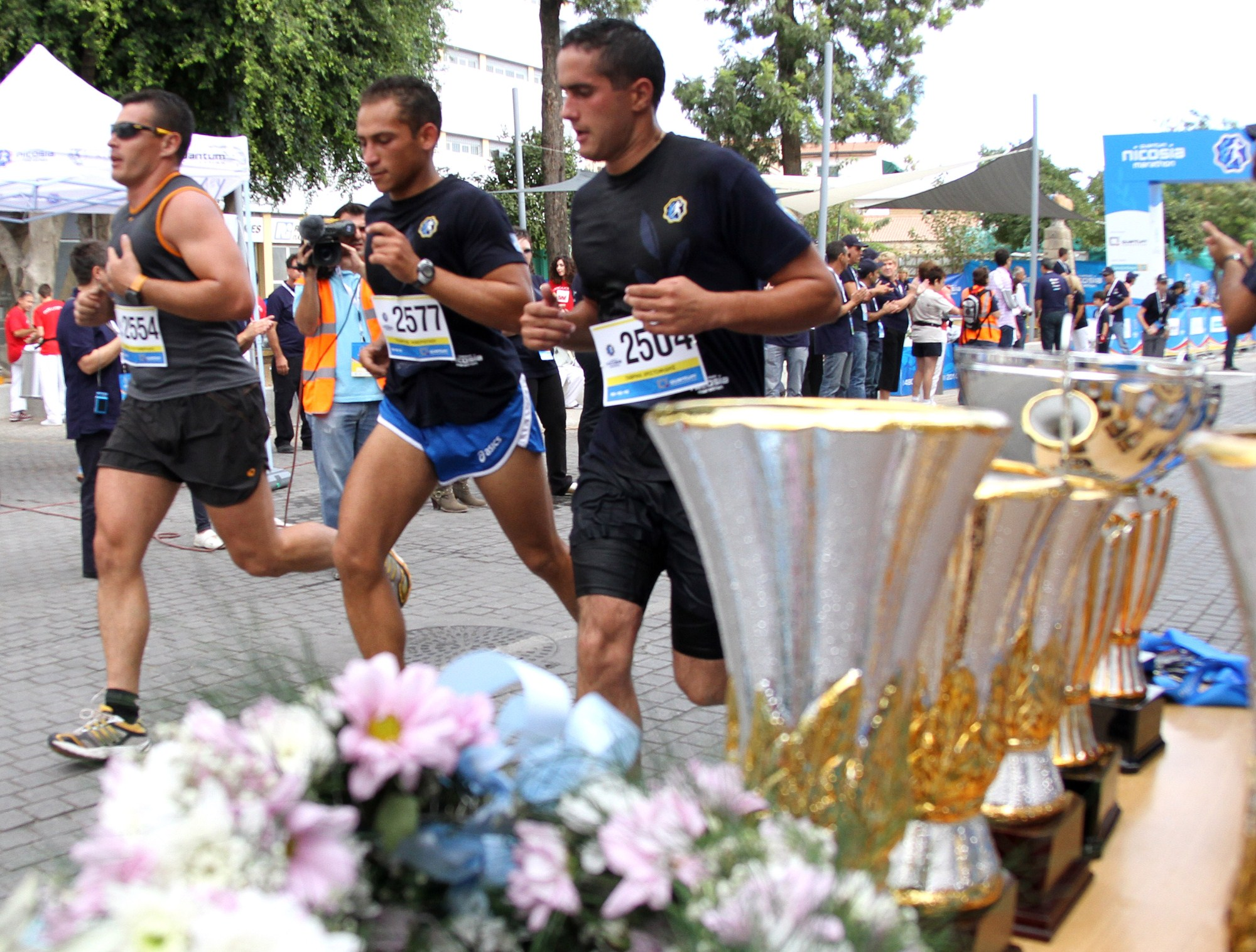

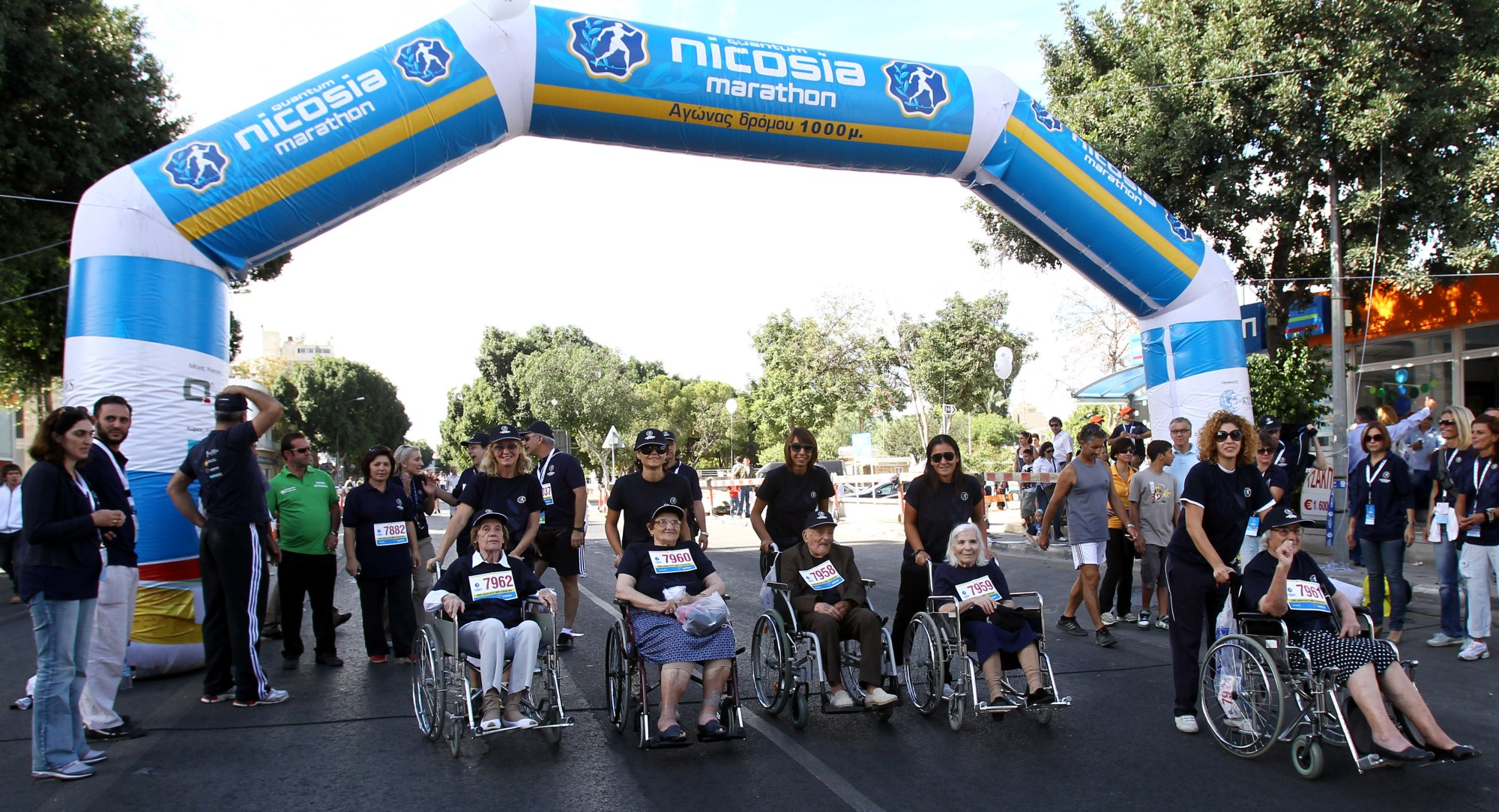

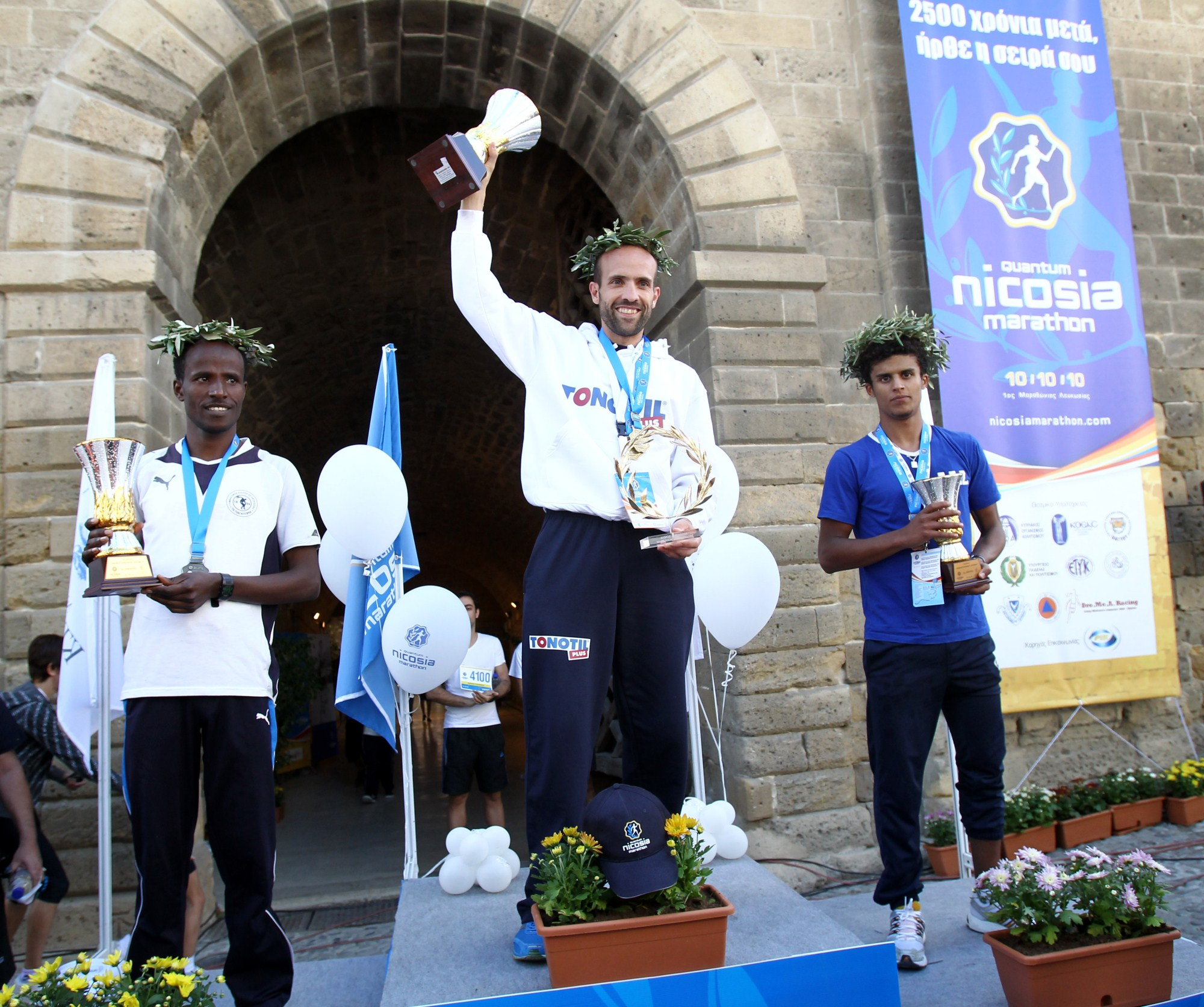

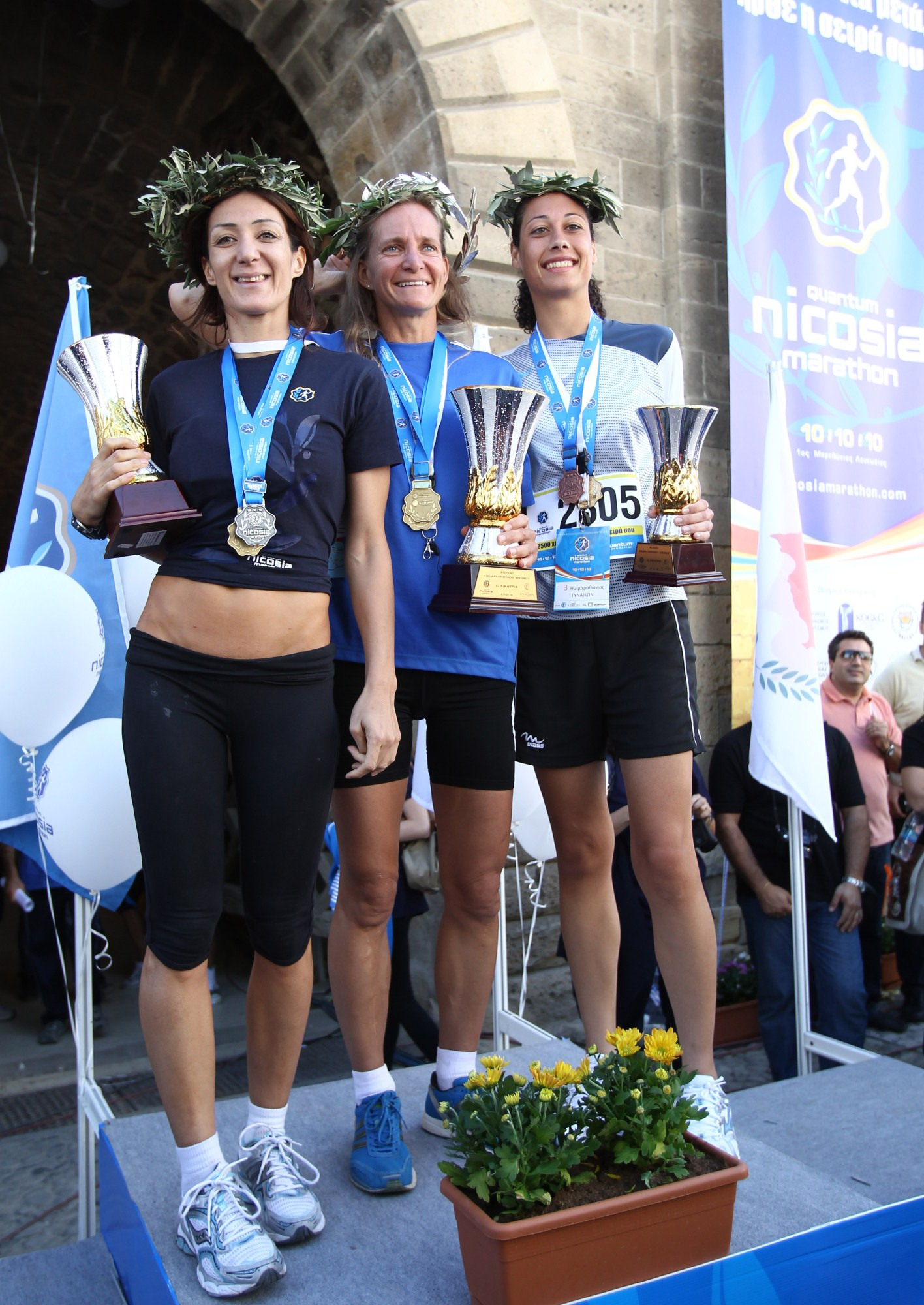

=== Marathon ===
Position	Men's winner	Time (h:m:s)	Women's winner	Time (h:m:s)
1	Dimitris Vogiatzis (Greece)	2:44:06	Amelie Willemot (France)	3:24:50
2	Paniccos Stylianou (Cyprus)	2:44:26	Maria Avraamidou (Cyprus)	3:40:07
3	Michael Keenan (UK)	2:46:45	Pola Hadjipapa (Cyprus)	3:54:52

=== Half marathon ===
Position	Men's winner	Time (h:m:s)	Women's winner	Time (h:m:s)
1	Konstantinos Poulios (Greece)	1:09:40	Mogdalini Gazea (Greece)	1:18:34
2	Dimokritos Papadavid (Cyprus)	1:22:07	Heidi Diakomopoulou (Cyprus)	1:27:01
3	Georgios Batas (Greece)	1:22:43	Victoria White (UK)	1:34:55

=== 10 km race ===
Position	Men's winner	Time (m:s)	Women's winner	Time (m:s)
1	Jebel Kassahun (ETH)	31:45	Carmen Macheriotou (Cyprus)	42:33
2	Panagioths Neofytou (Cyprus)	34:02	Giolanti Maou (Cyprus)	44:18
3	Kristopher Russell (UK)	34:02	Katerina Koukaki (Greece)	45:21

== List of winners of 2022 Marathon ==
=== Marathon ===
Position	Men's winner	Time (h:m:s)	Women's winner	Time (h:m:s)
1	Yiorgos Harakis (Cyprus)	2:44:27	Anna Kawalec (Poland)	3:21:03
2	Panos Georgiades (Cyprus)	2:53:04	Irina Masanova (Russia)	3:23:15
3	Dimitrios Koutsoumpides (Greece)	2:53:11	Elena Stylianou (Cyprus)	3:52:27

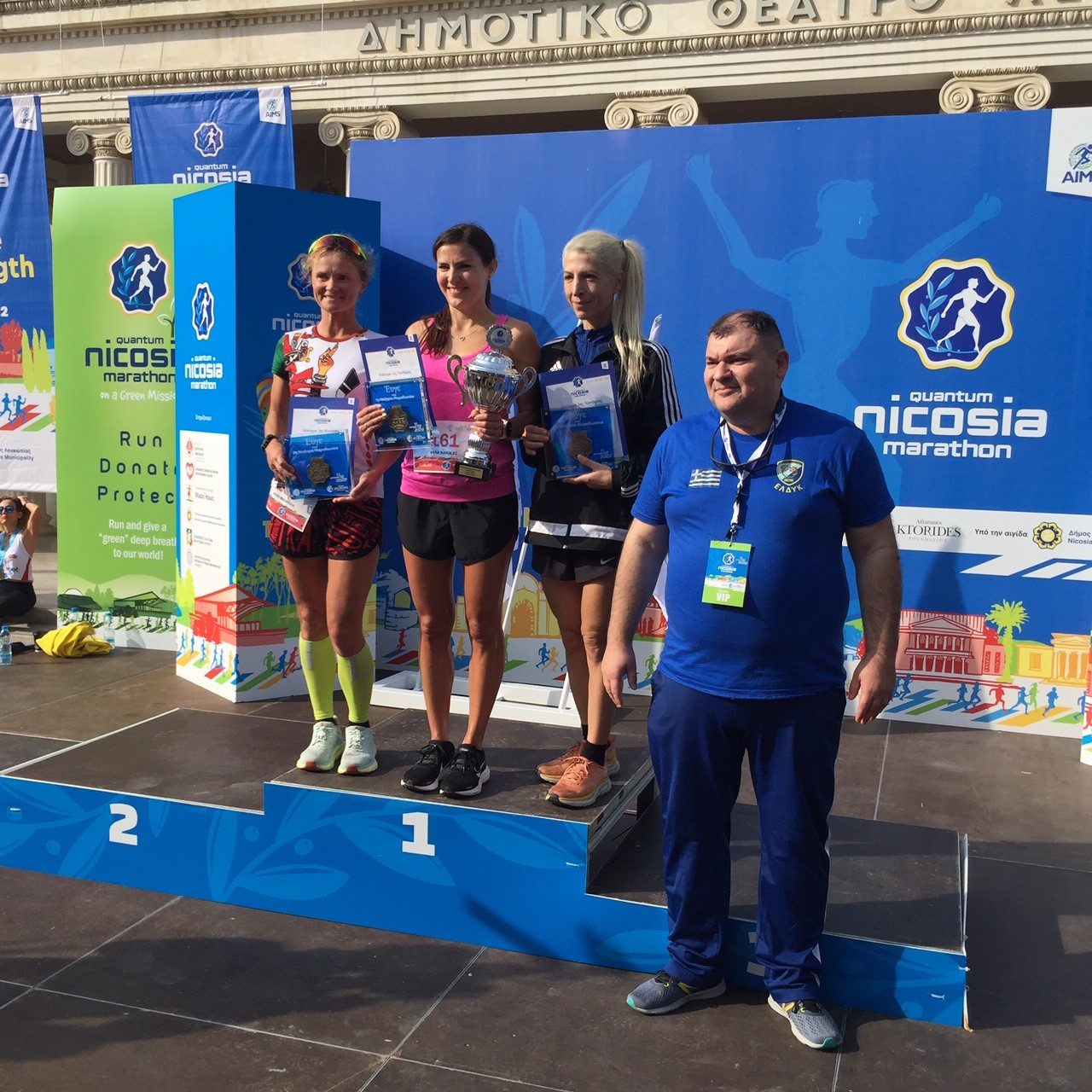
Winners of the Quantum Nicosia Marathon 2022, women

=== Half marathon ===
Position	Men's winner	Time (h:m:s)	Women's winner	Time (h:m:s)
1	Vladimir Shcheblykin (Russia)	1:13:44	Christina Kourri (Cyprus)	1:32:57
2	Christoforos Protopapas (Cyprus)	1:14:10	Julia Andreou (Cyprus)	1:35:39
3	Alexandros Dimitriou (Cyprus)	1:18:17	Andri Soteriou (Cyprus)	1:35:59

=== Stelios Kyriakides 7.7 miles race ===
Position	Men's winner	Time (m:s)	Women's winner	Time (m:s)
1	Yiorgos Tofi (Cyprus)	48:28	Zozan Timurturkan (Cyprus)	51:42
2	Savvas Savva (Cyprus)	48:35	Elia Ioannou (Cyprus)	53:25
3	Leandros Mama (Cyprus)	48:41	Panayiota Pantela (Cyprus)	56:59

=== 5 km race ===
Position	Men's winner	Time (m:s)	Women's winner	Time (m:s)
1	Yiorgos Tofi (Cyprus)	15:54	Victoria Andreou (Cyprus)	20:34
2	Andreas Zenios (Cyprus)	16:13	Evita Christoforou (Cyprus)	21:10
3	Christos Kyrillou (Cyprus)	17:17	Stavrini Tofarou Kanellou (Cyprus)	21:41

== List of winners of 2023 Marathon ==
=== Marathon ===
Position	Men's winner	Time (h:m:s)	Women's winner	Time (h:m:s)
1	Pavel Borodin (Russia)	2:37:38	Joanna Maria Drewnicka Ogrodnik (Poland)	3:11:08
2	Peter Hackett (United Kingdom)	2:37:55	Irina Masanova (Russia)	3:19:08
3	Leon Graumans (Netherlands)	2:38:49	Helena Kapakiotis (Cyprus)	3:33:00
