= Pedoulas =

Pedoulas: Πεδουλάς (Greek); Pedula (Turkish)
- Village
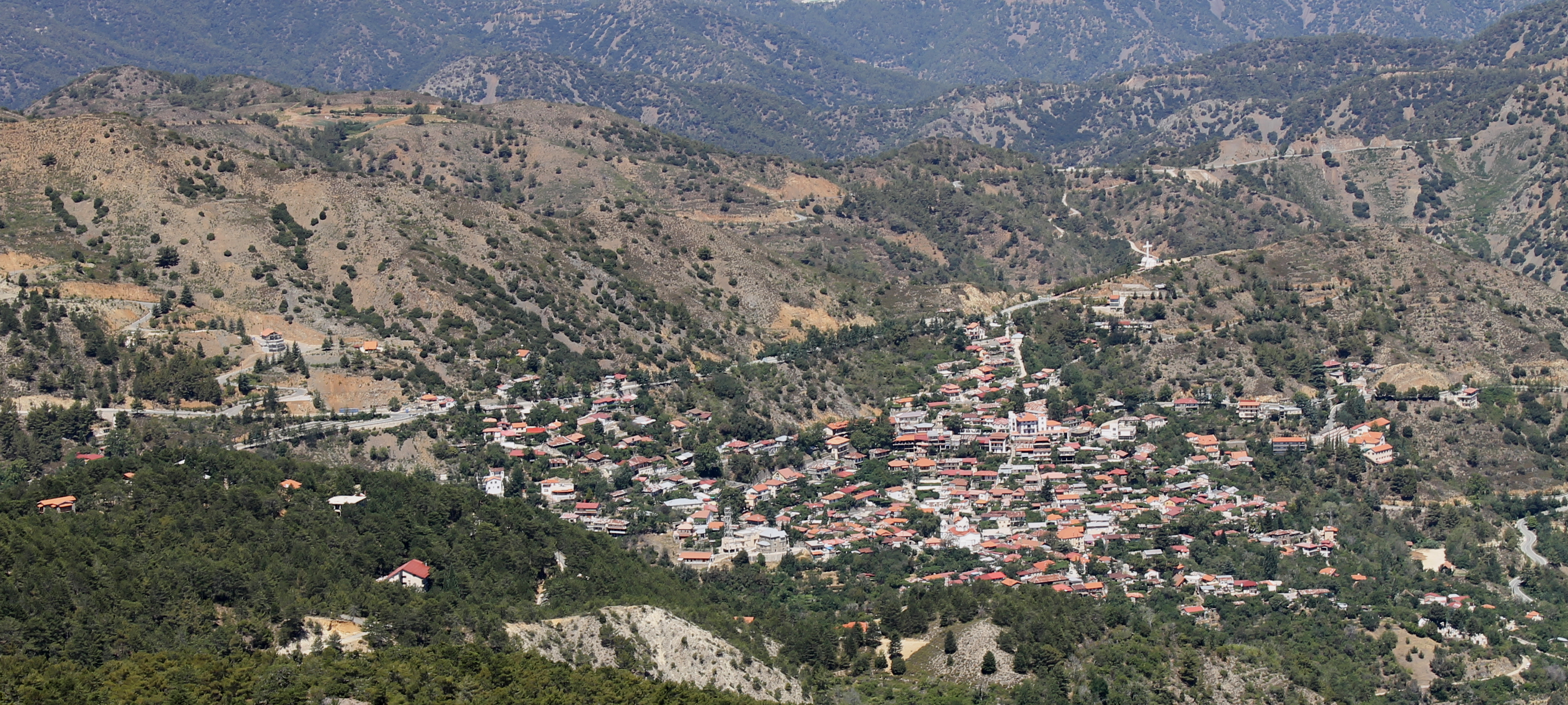

- Location in Cyprus
- Coordinates: 34°58′3″N 32°49′43″E
- Country: Cyprus
- District: Nicosia District

Government
  - Body: Pedoulas Community Council
  - President: Agathangelou Kostas
  - Vice President: Loizidou-Makridi Kleopatra

Population (2021)
  - Total: 139
- Time zone: UTC+2 (EET)
  - Summer (DST): UTC+3 (EEST)
- Postal Code: 2850
- Website: pedoulas.org.cy

Pedoulas (Greek: Πεδουλάς, Turkish: Pedula) is a village in the Nicosia District of Cyprus, located at an altitude of 1,100 metres (3,600 ft) in the Troodos Mountains, 4 km south of Moutoullas. It lies in the Marathasa Valley. The name is derived from the words pediada (valley) and laos (people). It is a popular summer resort.

== Churches ==
Pedoulas is known for its 12 churches, varying from a 15th-century chapel to a 1930s cathedral. The most important is the Archangelos Michael (Archangel Michael) church, which is a UNESCO World Heritage Site along with nine other Painted Churches in the Troödos Region. It was built in 1474.

Church of Holy Cross (Timios Stavros), the main church of Pedoulas, was built between 1933 and 1935. The most important relic of the Church of Holy Cross is a crucifix containing a piece of the Holy Cross, which was brought from Constantinople. The church replaced the old timber-roofed church and kept its icons and parts of iconostasis from the 16th century. In 1986, on top of a hill overlooking Pedoulas, the 25m high Holy Cross was built, standing near a chapel. Not far from the Holy Cross a monument was built to honor Michalis Stivaros and all those killed in the Balkan Wars. The monument was built in 2011 by Athanasios Ktorides Foundation.

== Museums ==
Pedoulas has two museums: the Byzantine Museum, opened in 1999, and the Folklore Museum, opened in 2005. The Byzantine Museum is situated near the Archangel Michael church and houses very important icons and relics from the 13th to 20th century.

== Gallery ==
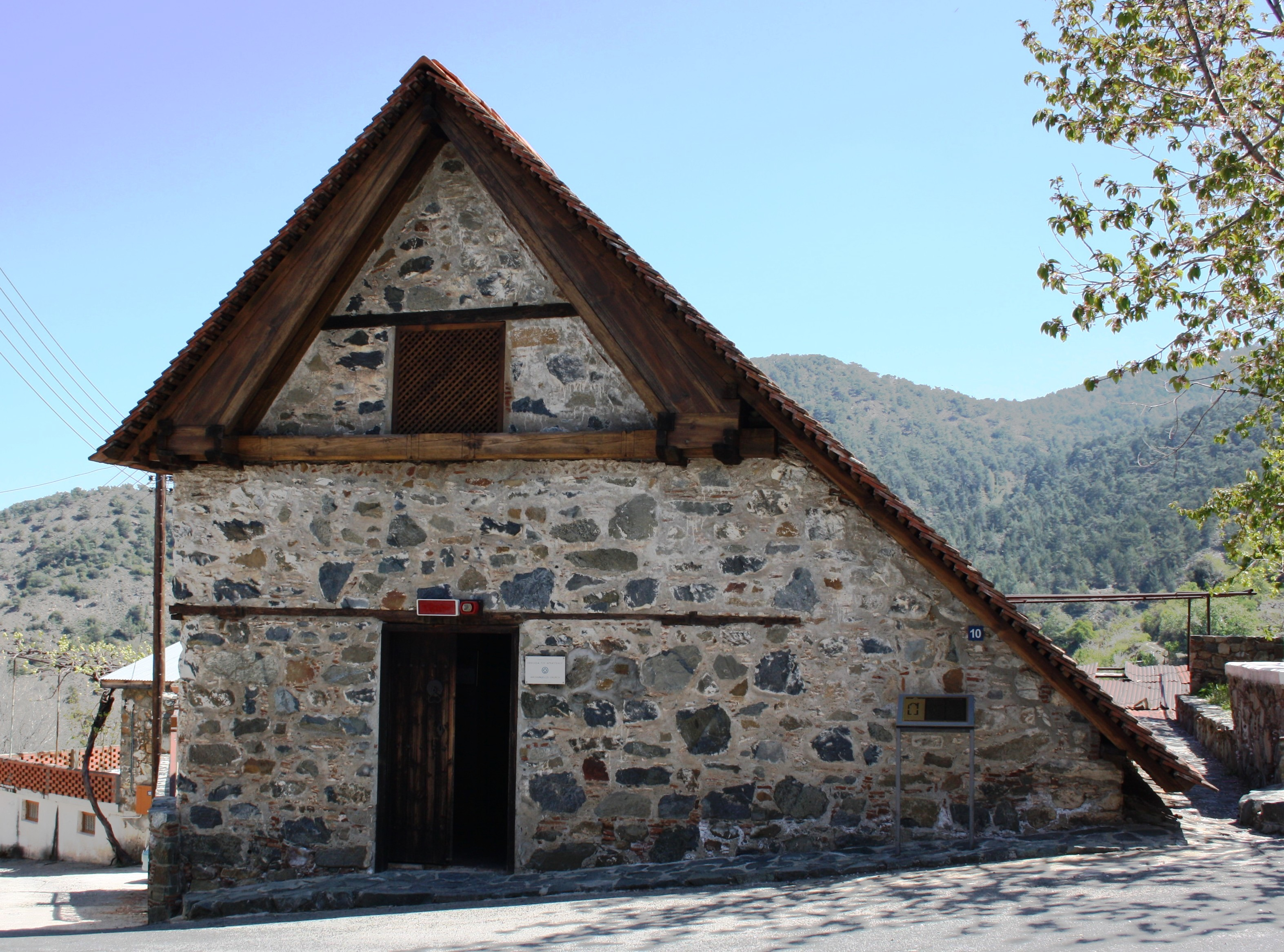
Archangelos Michael church

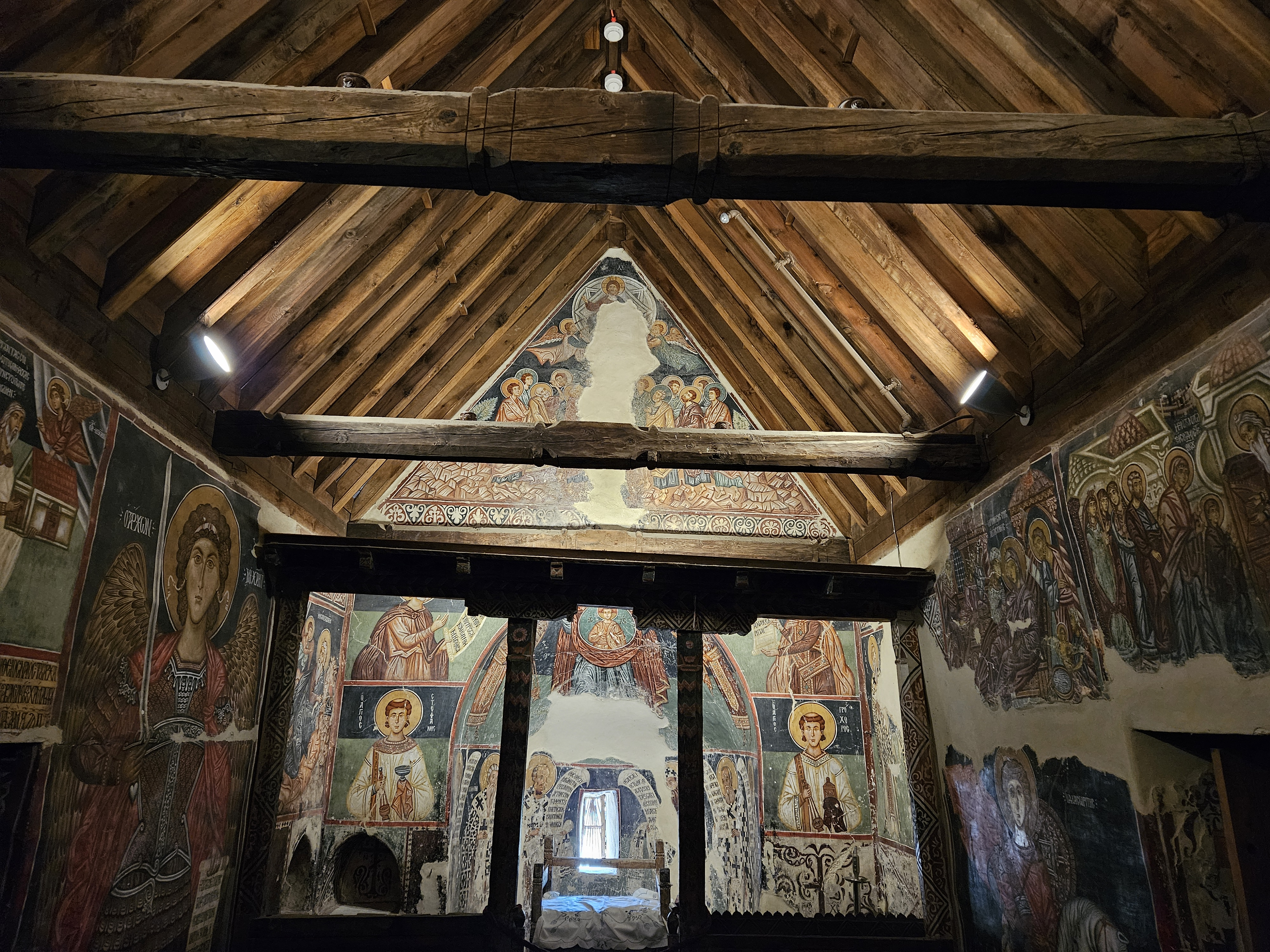
Archangelos Michael church interior

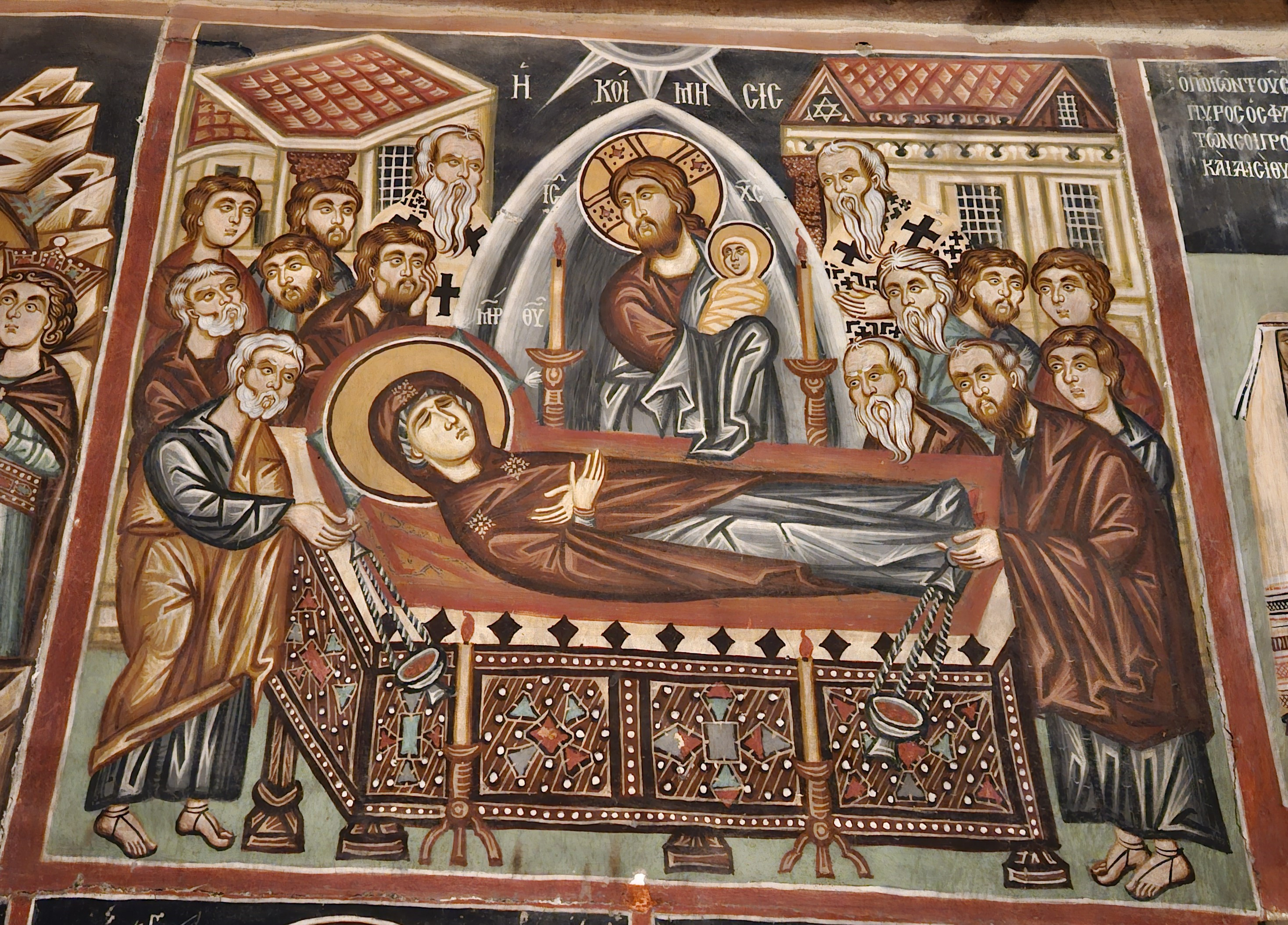
Archangelos Michael: Dormition

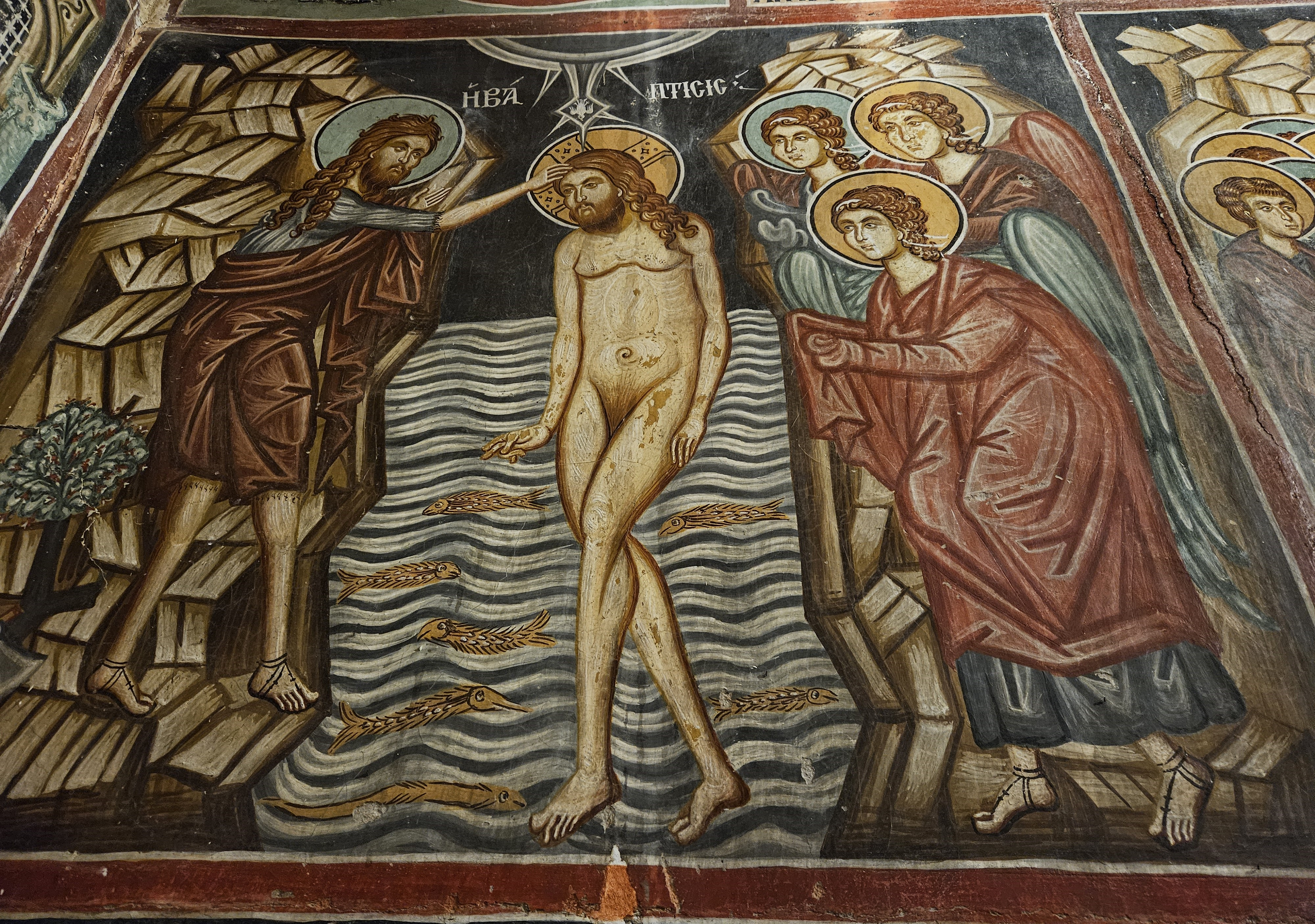
Archangelos Michael: Jesus exiting the Jordan River after being baptized

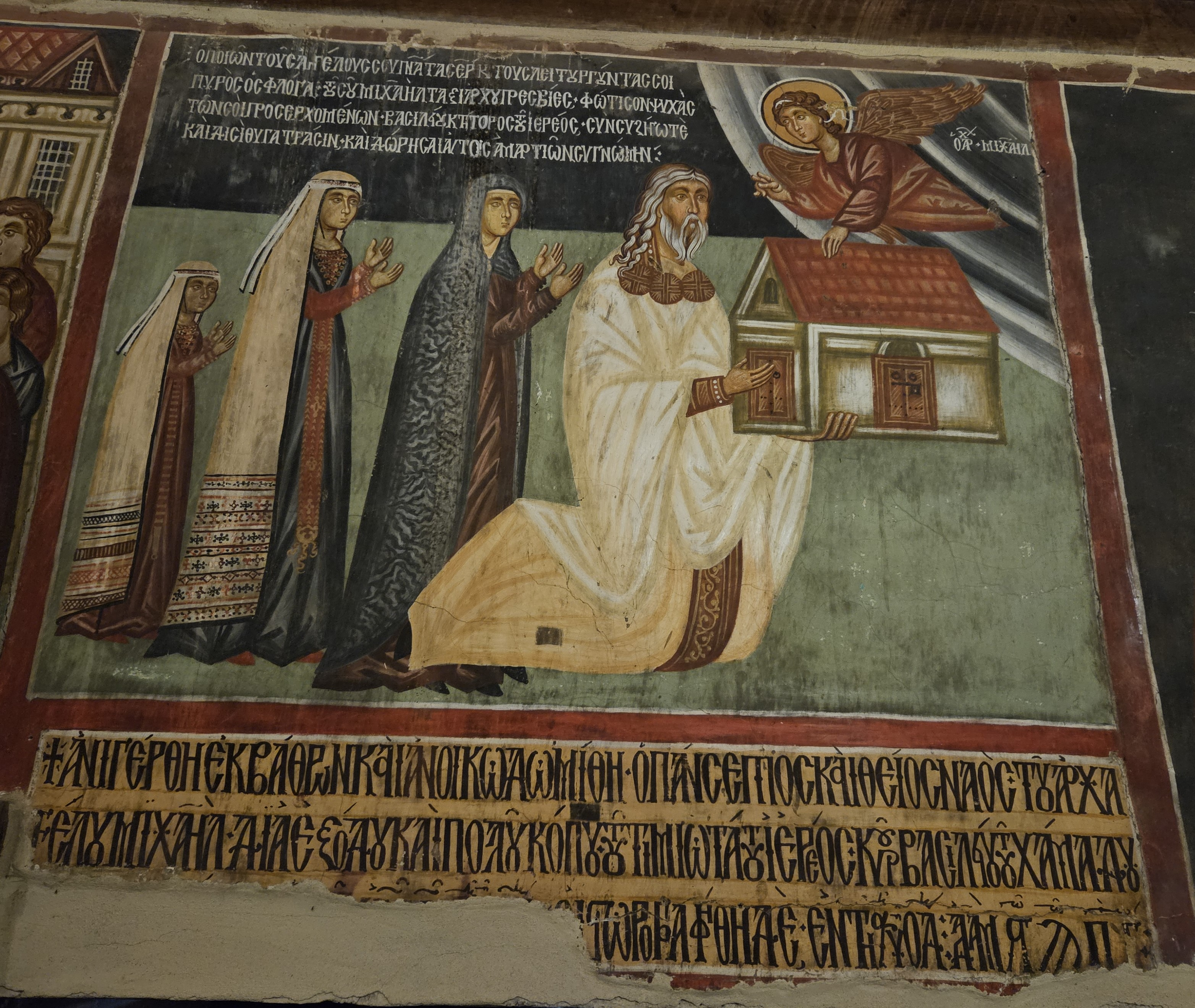
Archangelos Michael: The inscription says that the church was funded by a priest named Vassilios Chamados in 1474. Above the inscription are the priest, his wife and two daughters offering the church model to Jesus.

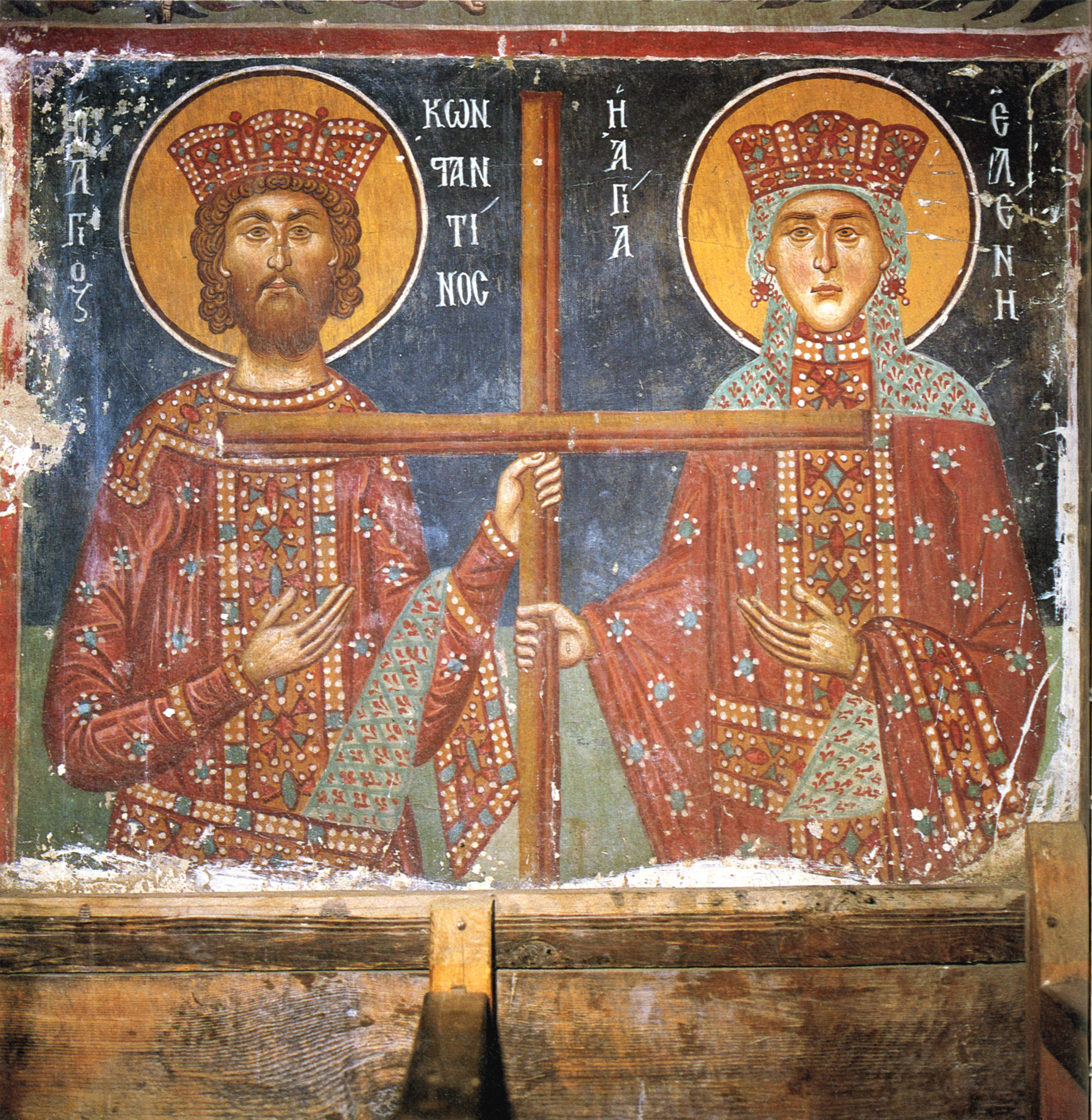
Saint Constantine and his mother Saint Helena

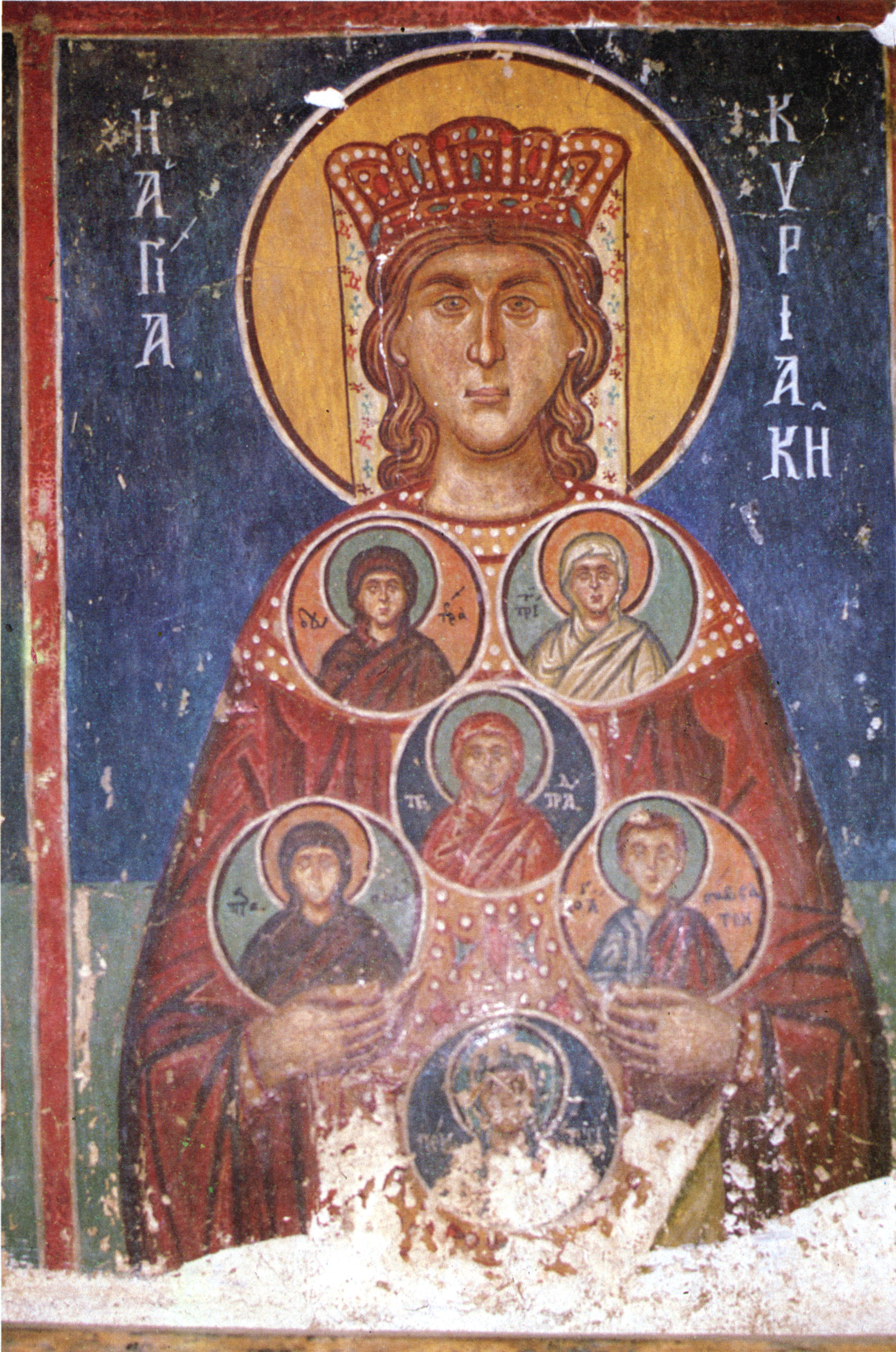
Saint Sunday (Kyriaki)

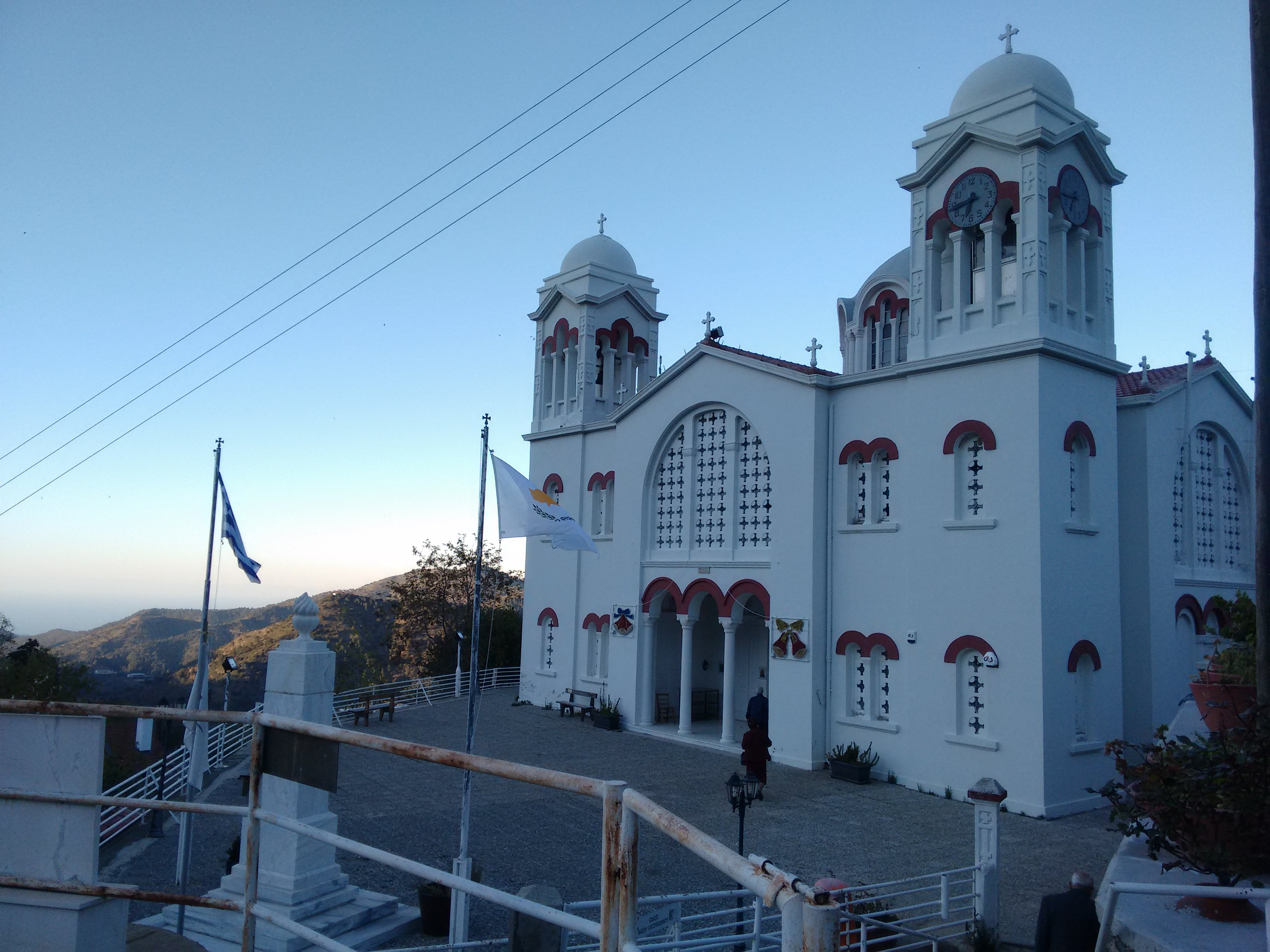
Church of Holy Cross (Timios Stavros)

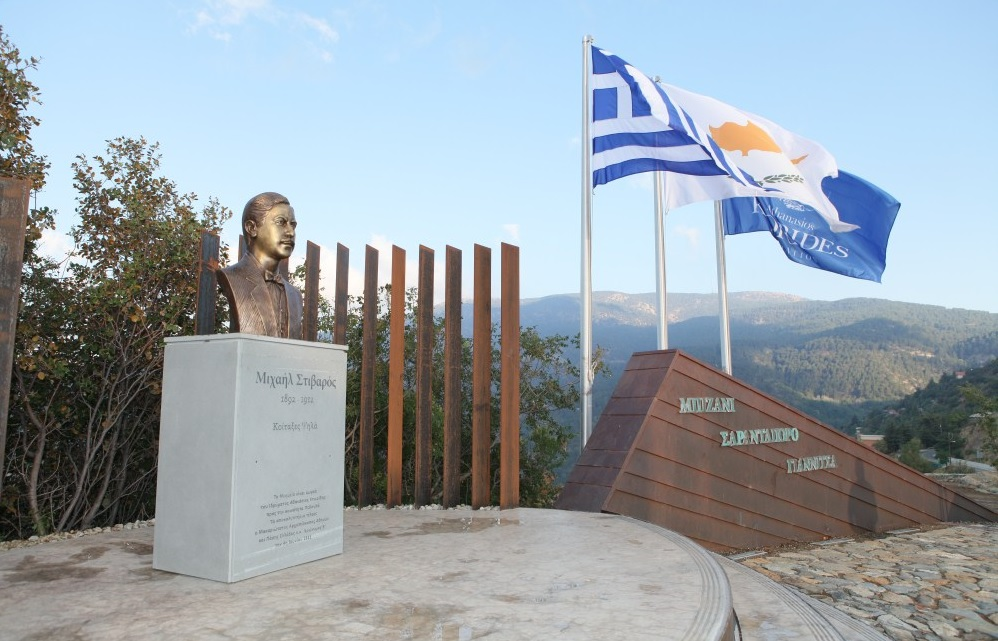
Monument to Michalis Stivaros and Balkan Wars memorial
