= Michalis Stivaros =

Michalis Stivaros Μιχαήλ Στιβαρός
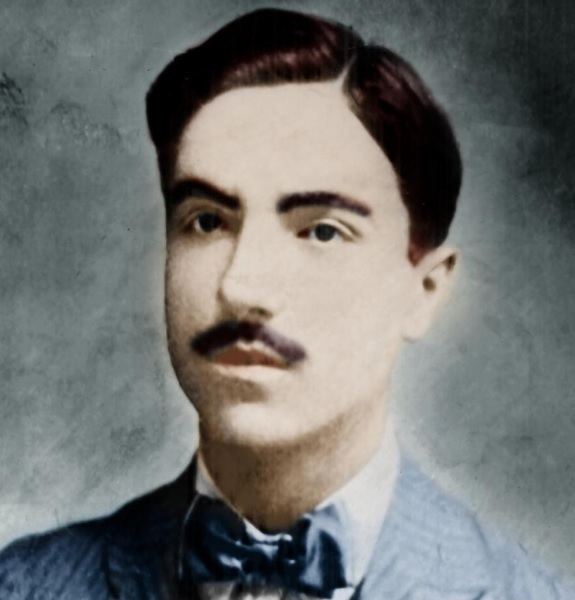
- Born: 1892; Pedoulas, British Cyprus
- Died: December 5, 1912

Michalis Stivaros (Greek: Μιχαήλ Στιβαρός; 1892 in Pedoulas, Cyprus – 5 December 1912 in Bizani, Epirus, Greece) was a Cypriot soldier, voluntarily enlisted in Greek army and fighting in the First Balkan War. He was killed in prelude of battle of Bizani in December 1912.

== Life and work ==
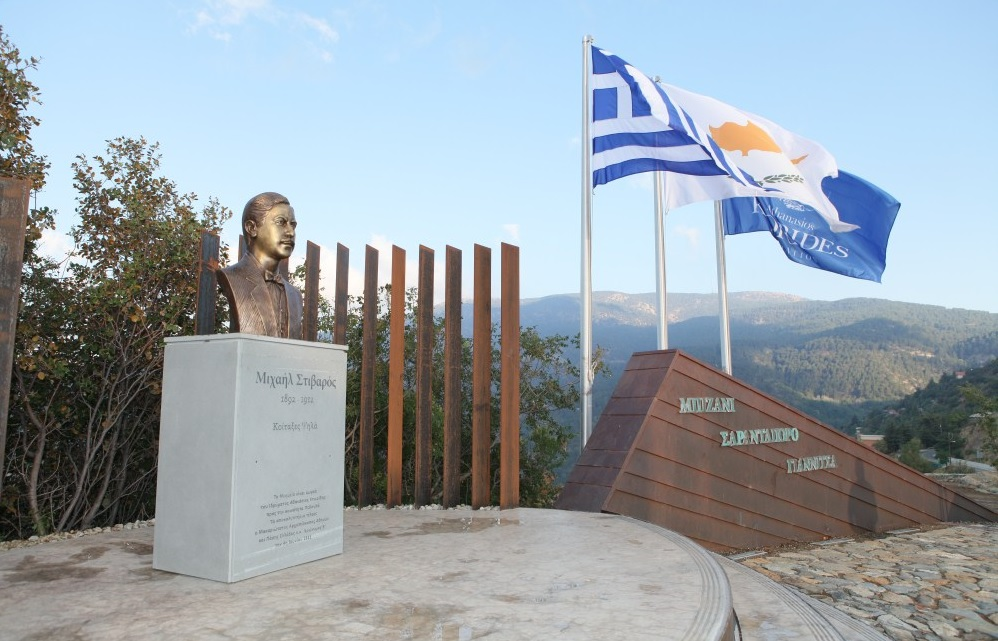
Monument to Michalis Stivaros and the Balkan Wars

Michalis Stivaros was born in 1892 in Pedoulas, village in the Nicosia District of Cyprus.

He grew up in his hometown Pedoulas, located at 1100 metres in the Troodos Mountains. He graduated the Pancyprian Gymnasium in 1911. In 1911 he enrolled in the Medical School of Athens University.

At the outbreak of First Balkan War in October 1912, Michalis Stivaros signed up as a volunteer in the Greek Army, together with another 2000 Cypriots. He was in the 1st Battalion of the Independent Cretan Regiment. His unit, in which there were many Cypriot students, was sent to the front in Epirus on October 23, 1912. He fought for liberation of Epirus from Turks. Michalis Stivaros took part in the battles of Peston, Aetorahi and Bizani. He was killed on December 5, 1912, in the prelude to the Battle of Bizani. For long time his relatives considered him to be missing.

== Monument ==
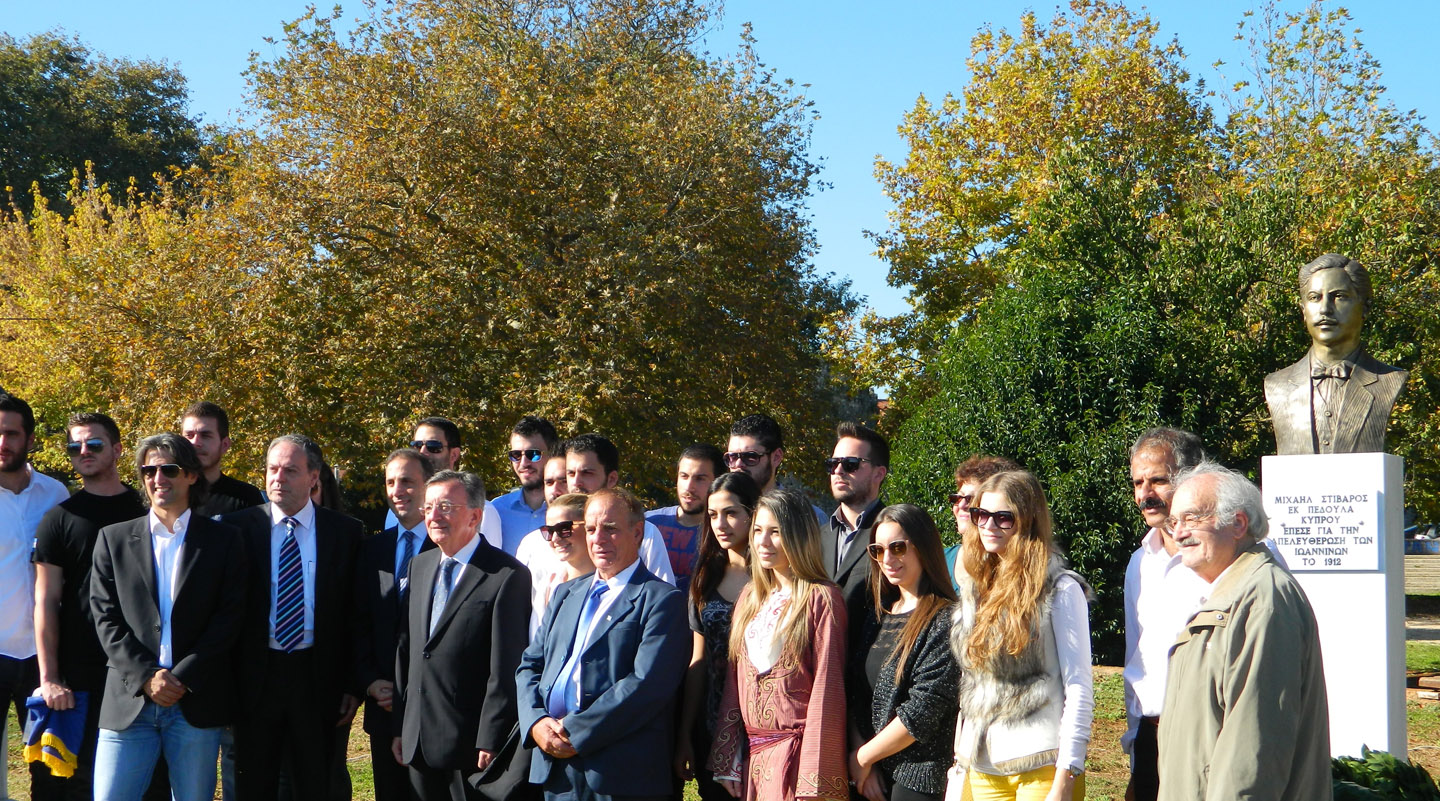
Unveiling statue of the Cypriot hero Michalis Stivaros in Ioannina

In the village of Pedoulas Athanasios Ktorides Foundation built a monument dedicated to Stivaros and all those who died in the First Balkan War in 2011. On a mountain top overlooking Pedoulas, the monument is erected as a symbol of the heroism of all Cypriots who fought in the Balkan wars. The Foundation also erected and unveiled bust of Michalis Stivaros on 28 October 2013 in Ioannina in Greece. His name was engrave in column of fallen student of Athens University and in column of fallen students of the Pancyprian Gymnasium.

== See also ==
- Christodoulos Sozos, mayor of Limassol who also died at the battle of Bizani
