= Michalis Karaolis =

Cypriot rebel

Michalis Karaolis Μιχαλάκης Καραολής
- Born: 13 February 1933; Palaichori Oreinis, British Cyprus
- Died: 10 May 1956 (aged 23); Nicosia Prison, Nicosia, British Cyprus
- Cause of death: Execution by hanging

Michalis Karaolis (Greek: Μιχαλάκης Καραολής; 13 February 1933 – 10 May 1956) was a Cypriot public official and revolutionary. Born in the village of Palaichori Oreinis of Pitsilia, Karaolis worked as a government clerk and a member of EOKA (the National Organisation of Cypriot Fighters). He was the first to be sentenced to death and hanged alongside Andreas Dimitriou on 10 May 1956.

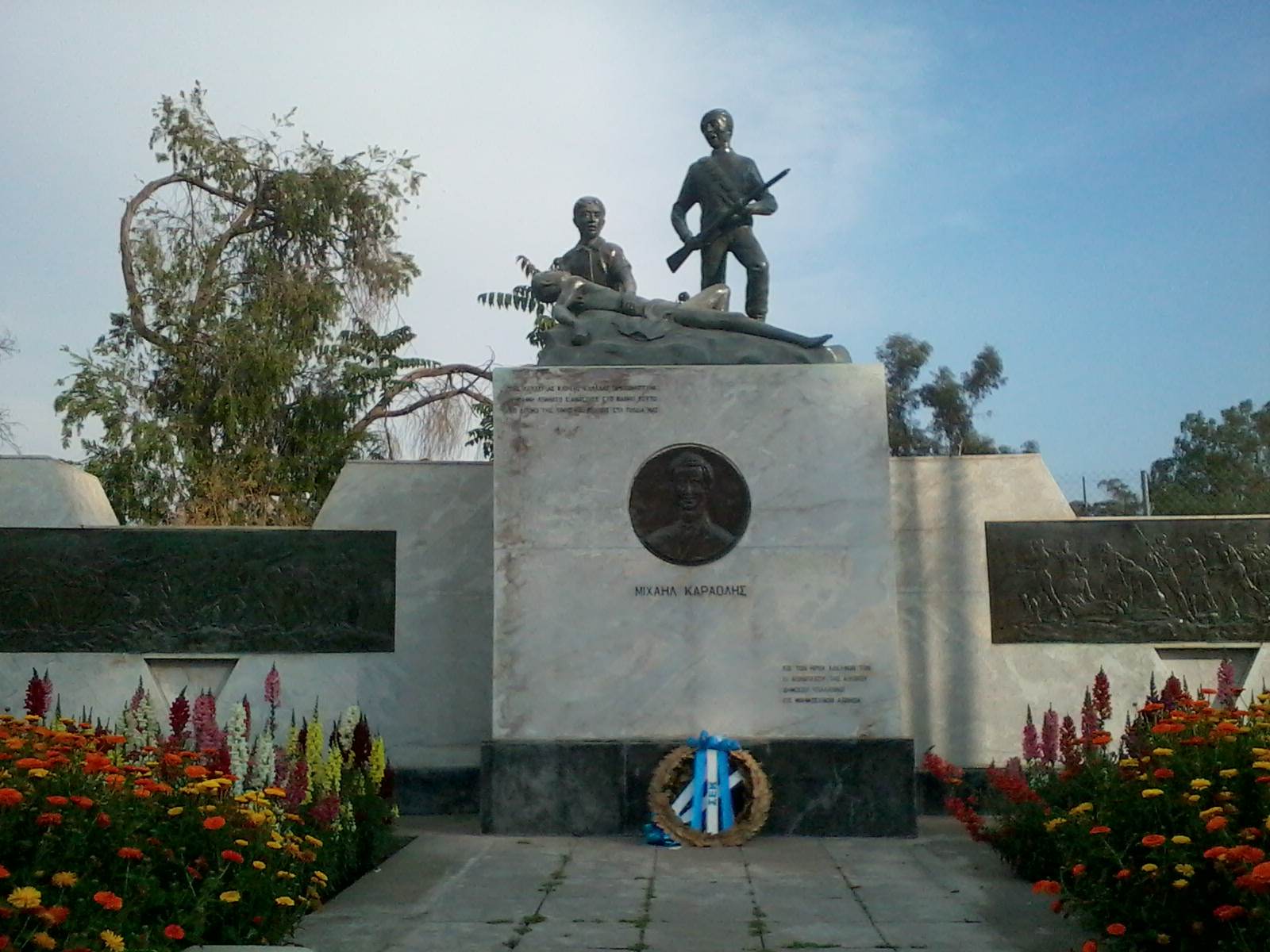
Michalis Karaolis monument in Nicosia

== Life and work ==
Michalis Karaolis was born on 13 February 1933 in Palaichori Oreinis, Cyprus. He finished primary school in Palaichori and The English School in Nicosia. He worked as a tax clerk. During the 1955–59 national uprising against the British, many of APOEL's athletes and members of the club were active members of EOKA. The most outstanding example being the club's track and field athlete Michalis Karaolis.

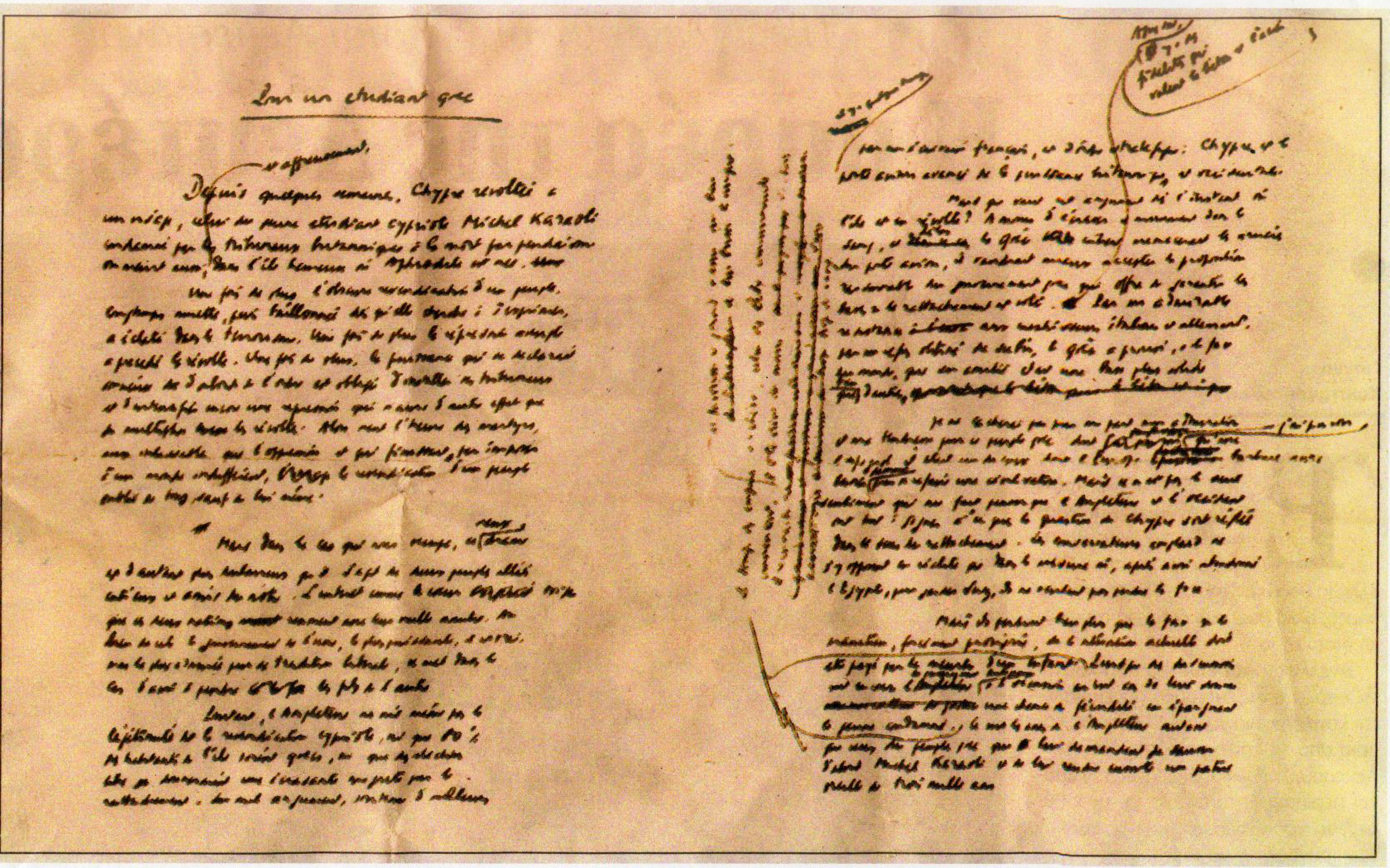
Albert Camus appealed to Queen Elizabeth for Michalis Karaolis

He was a member of EOKA long before 1955 in a group headed by Polycarpos Giorkatzis. On 28 August 1955, he carried out the public execution of P.C. Michael Poullis, a Cypriot police officer, of the Special Branch who had been spying on the Nicosia groups of EOKA and interfering with their work. The assassination was carried out in broad daylight whilst P.C. Poullis was on duty at an AKEL meeting at the Ledra Palace.

Karaolis was captured on his way to meet Grigoris Afxentiou's guerrillas in the Kyrenia mountains, following General George Grivas' orders.

Field Marshal Harding chose to announce Karaolis' death sentence on 28 October, an important Greek national holiday marking the refusal of Greece to surrender to the Axis powers in the Second World War, and that hugely inflamed public feeling.

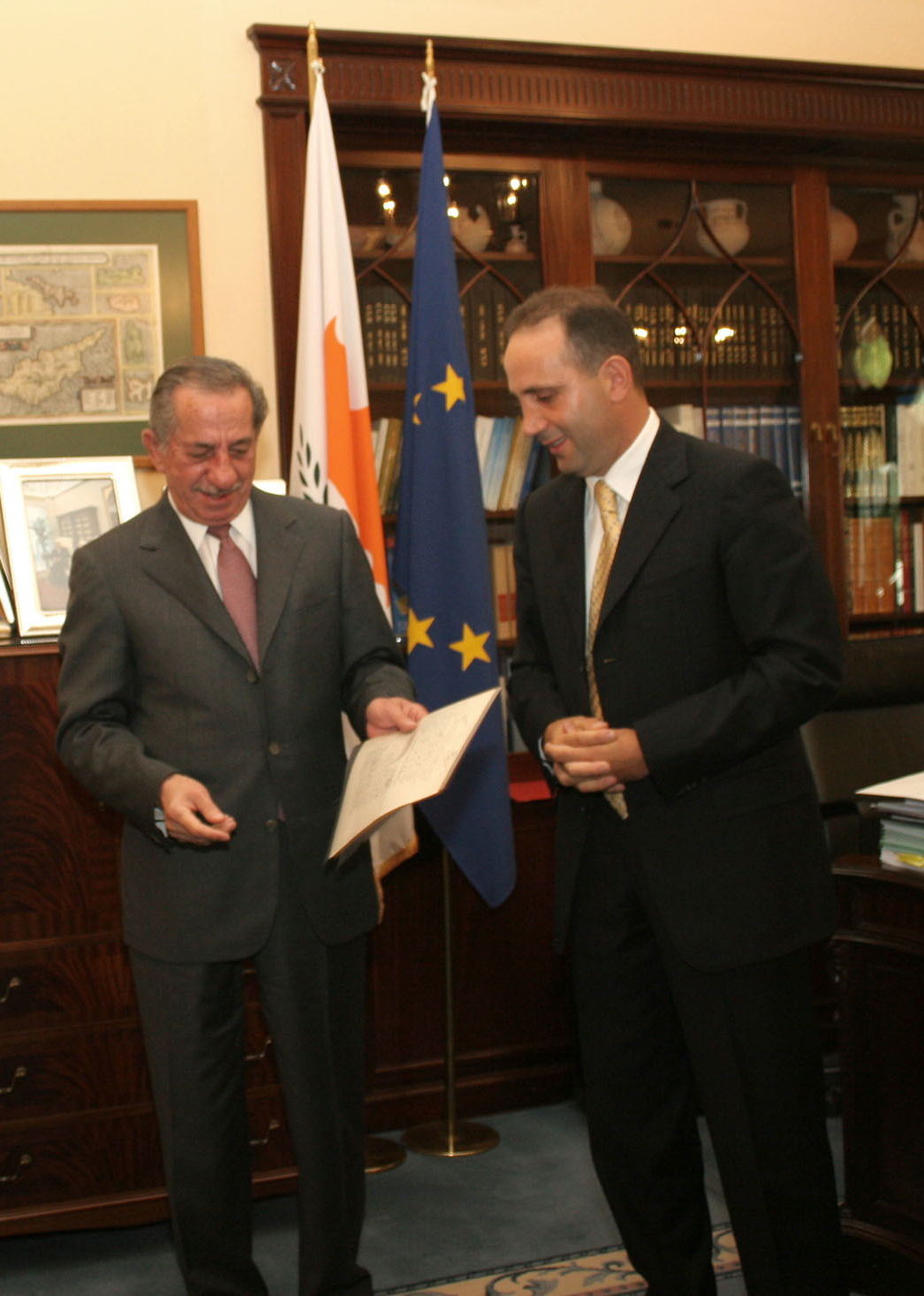
Nasos Ktorides handing out Albert Camus letter about Caraolis to President Tassos Papadopoulos

== Execution ==
He was 23 years old when he was executed for the murder of P.C. Poullis and buried in the Imprisoned Graves in the Central Jail of Nicosia.

French philosopher and Nobel Prize winner Albert Camus appealed to Queen Elizabeth for mercy. That letter was acquired by philanthropist and entrepreneur Nasos Ktorides and donated to the National Struggle Museum in Nicosia.

The hangings were condemned internationally and caused serious demonstrations and unrest in Greece. The Athens police failed to suppress a huge demonstration and a riot developed in which 7 people were killed and 200 people were injured. The Mayor of Athens protested by taking a hammer to a commemorative marble plaque dedicated in honour of Queen Elizabeth II and Prince Philip while a crowd cheered and applauded and there were many more similar scenes in Greece.

== Sources ==
- The Memoirs of General Grivas, by General Grivas, edited by Charles Foley. Longman. London. 1964
- CYPRUS: Deepening Tragedy, Time Magazine, Monday, 21 May 1956.
- Demetra Demetriou The pleiade in Cyprus: French authors and the island of Aphrodite p.303
- Remembering Karaolis - a historical document by Albert Camus, Financial mirror 28 March 2017
