= List of power stations in Egypt =

This article lists power stations in Egypt.

== Gas ==
Name	Operator	Governorate	Type	Capacity (MW)	Commission date	Ref
Beni Suef Power Plant	UEEPC^{[e]}	Beni Suef	CCGT	4,800	2018	
Burullus Power Plant	MDEPC^{[c]}	Kafr El Sheikh	CCGT	4,800	2018	
New Capital Power Plant	CEPC ^{[a]}	Cairo	CCGT	4,800	2018	
Cairo North Power Plant	CEPC^{[a]}	Cairo	CCGT	1,500	Stage 1: 2004 Stage 2: 2007	
Damietta Power Plant	EDEPC^{[b]}	Damietta	CCGT	1,200	1989	
El Atf Power Plant	MDEPC^{[c]}	Kafr El Sheikh	CCGT	750	2006	
El Kureimat Power Plant	UEEPC^{[e]}	Minya	CCGT ISCC	3,000	Stage 1: 2008 Stage 2: 2010	
El Nubaria Power Plant	MDEPC^{[c]}	Alexandria	CCGT	2,250	Stage 1: 2005 Stage 2: 2010	
Hurghada Power Plant	EDEPC^{[b]}	Red Sea	CCGT	143	2002	
Sidi Krir Power Plant	WDEPC^{[d]}	Alexandria	CCGT	750	2000	
Talkha Power Plant	MDEPC^{[c]}	Dakahlia	CCGT	290	1979	
New Talkha Power Plant	MDEPC^{[c]}	Dakahlia	CCGT	750	2007	

Cairo Electricity Production Company

East Delta Electricity Production Company

Middle Delta Electricity Production Company

West Delta Electricity Production Company

Upper Egypt Electricity Production Company

== Hydroelectric ==
Name	Governorate	Type	Capacity (MW)	Commission date	Ref
Aswan High Dam	Aswan	Embankment	2,100 (2400 MW after upgrading)	1970	
Aswan Low Dam	Aswan	Gravity	592	1960	
Nag Hammadi Dam	Qena	Gravity	64	2008	

== Nuclear ==
Name	Operator	Governorate	Reactor type	Capacity (MW)	Commission date	Ref
El Dabaa Nuclear Power Plant		Matrouh	VVER-1200	4,800	2028 (expected)	

== Oil- and gas-fired thermal ==
Name	Operator	Governorate	Type	Capacity (MW)	Commission date	Ref
Cairo West Power Plant		Giza		1,360	2010	
Ain Sokhna Power Plant		Suez		1,300	2014	
Abu Qir Power Plant		Alexandria		930	1991	
El Tebbin Power Station		Cairo	Thermal	700	2010	

== Solar ==
Name	Operator	Governorate	Type	Capacity (MW)	Commission date	Ref
Benban Solar Park	NREA^{[f]}	Aswan	PV power station	1,650	2019	
Kom Ombo solar park	NREA^{[f]}	Kom Ombo	PV power station	200	2021	
Abydos solar PV plant	AMEA Power	Aswan	PV power station with co-located 300 MWh battery storage	500	2024 (solar); 2025 (battery storage)	
Access Egypt Solar One Power Plant	Access Power Limited	Aswan	PV power station	50	2018	
Nefer Minya Solar Park		Minya	PV power station	1,200	Under construction	

== Wind ==
Name	Operator	Governorate	Type	Capacity (MW)	Commission date	Ref
Zafarana Wind Farms	NREA^{[f]}	El Zaafrana	Wind farm	545	2001	
Gabal El-Zeit Wind Farm	NREA^{[f]}	Jabal Al-Zayt	Wind farm	220 (580 MW when completed)	2018	

New and Renewable Energy Authority

== See also ==
- List of largest power stations
- Lists of power stations
