= Burullus Power Plant =

- Country: Egypt
- Location: Sidi Salem, Kafr El Sheikh
- Coordinates: 31°31′46″N 30°48′32″E
- Status: Operational
- Construction began: 2015
- Commission date: 2018
- Owner: Egyptian Electricity Holding Company (EEHC)
- Operator: Egyptian Electricity Holding Company

Thermal power station
- Primary fuel: Natural gas
- Combined cycle?: Yes

Power generation
- Units operational: 4 x 1200 MW
- Nameplate capacity: 4,800 MW

The Burullus Power Plant (El Burullus Power Plant) is a natural gas-fired combined cycle power plant located in Sidi Salem, Kafr El Sheikh, Egypt, on an isthmus between Lake Burullus and the Mediterranean Sea. It is operated by Egyptian Electricity Holding Company. Construction of the plant started in October of 2015, and was completed by July of 2018.

The Burullus Power Plant has an installed capacity of 4.8 GW, making it the most powerful power plant in Egypt along with Beni Suef Power Plant and New Capital Power Plant, which both have the same installed capacity.

The power plant has four units, each with two gas turbines and a downstream steam turbine. A heat recovery steam generator is connected to each gas turbine and supplies the steam turbine. Siemens gas turbines of the SGT5-8000H type and steam turbines of the SST-5000 type are used in the plant.

== See also ==
- List of power stations in Egypt
