= Alfanar Projects =

Arabian engineering company

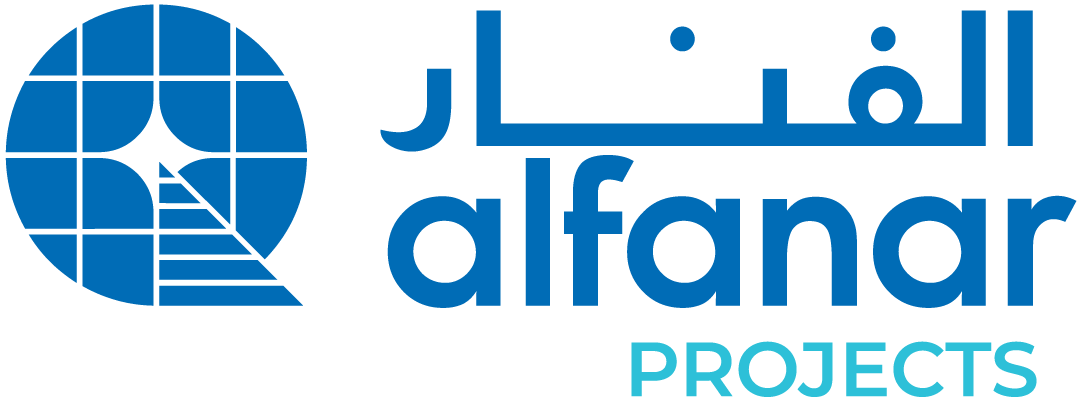
- Native name: الفنار للمشاريع
- Type: Private
- Industry: Project development, engineering construction, technology solutions
- Founded: 1976
- Founder: Abdulsalam Al Mutlaq
- Headquarters: Riyadh, Saudi Arabia
- Area served: Worldwide
- Key people: Abdulsalam Al Mutlaq (Chairman); Sabah Al Mutlaq (Managing Director); Mohamed Al Mutlaq (Deputy Managing Director); Jamal Wadi (President); Amer Al Ajmi (Chief Executive Officer - AES); Khalid Al Solami (Executive Vice President - AEC); Wasim Al Malouhi (Chief Executive Officer - AGD); Mishal Al Mutlaq (Chief Investment Officer)
- Number of employees: 28,000
- Parent: Alfanar Group
- Website: alfanarprojects.com

Alfanar Projects (Arabic: الفنار للمشاريع) is a global engineering, construction, and technology solutions company, based in Saudi Arabia, that operates across the energy, water, and infrastructure sectors. It forms one of the three main divisions of Alfanar Group, a privately held Saudi Arabian conglomerate engaged in manufacturing electrical and electronic products, together with engineering and construction services.

== History ==
Alfanar Projects was founded in Saudi Arabia in 1976. The business began as Alfanar Construction, primarily focused on electrification and power infrastructure. Over the years, the company diversified into renewable energy, water infrastructure, and digital transformation. In 2023, the business rebranded as Alfanar Projects to reflect its expanded scope.

Today, Alfanar Projects operates in several countries including Saudi Arabia, Egypt, Spain, India, the United Kingdom, and the United Arab Emirates. It contributes to Saudi Vision 2030 through renewable energy and digital transformation initiatives - one of which includes the installation of five million smart meters for the Saudi Electricity Company between 2019 and 2021.

== Key projects ==
- Lighthouse green fuels (Teesside, UK): Producing over 180 million litres of sustainable aviation fuel annually.
- NEOM residential communities (Saudi Arabia): Design, build, finance, and operation of five sustainable communities within NEOM.
- Wind energy (Spain): Development and operation of several wind farms, including Estancia, Escalereta II, and Chinchilla de Montearagón.
- Green hydrogen project (Egypt): Signed a memorandum of understanding (MoU) with the General Authority of the Suez Canal Economic Zone (SCZone), the Sovereign Fund of Egypt (TSFE), the Egyptian Electricity Transmission Company (EETC) and the New and Renewable Energy Authority (NREA) to produce 500,000 tonnes of green ammonia, used in agricultural fertilisers, through renewable energy.
- Wind energy (India): Construction and operation of wind farms in Gujarat’s Kutch Districts, with a 300 MW phase complete and expansion underway.
- Smart meter rollout (Saudi Arabia): Installation of five million smart meters in collaboration with Saudi Electricity Company and Mobily.
- Jazan Entertainment Complex (Jazan, Saudi Arabia): A SAR 1.3 billion waterfront development featuring a leisure and entertainment destination with indoor attractions, retail, dining, cinema, and family-oriented recreational facilities.
- Battery Energy Storage Systems – BESS (Saudi Arabia): Delivery of utility-scale battery storage facilities under contracts awarded by Saudi Electricity Company to enhance grid stability, enable renewable-energy integration, and support national energy-transition objectives.
- High-Voltage Direct Current – HVDC (Saudi Arabia): Construction of large-capacity HVDC infrastructure for Saudi Electricity Company, providing up to 7 GW of transmission capability and connecting regional grids to strengthen reliability and long-distance power transfer across the Kingdom.

== Sustainability initiatives ==
Alfanar Projects is committed to sustainability and renewable energy.

- In 2015, it contributed 50 MW to Egypt’s Benban Solar Park - one of the world’s largest solar projects.
- In 2020, the company acquired Senvion India, expanding its wind energy portfolio.

== Operations ==
The company operates through four divisions:

- Alfanar Engineering Construction: Engineering and construction for power, water, and infrastructure.
- Alfanar Global Development: Project development, financing, and operations.
- Alfanar Engineering Services: Maintenance, testing, and calibration for motors and generators.
- Alfanar Digital Solutions: Focused on systems integration, cybersecurity, business intelligence, and AI.
