= Geographical indications in Tunisia =

Geographical Indications in Tunisia are a form of intellectual property available for "natural or processed agricultural and food products". Geographical indications can be registered based on the Law No. 99-57 of June 28, 1999, on Controlled Appellations of Origin and Indications of Source of Agricultural Products Registrations is possible as a Appellation of Origin (Appellation d'origine contrôlée, AOC) or as an Indication of Source (Indication de Provenance, IP).

Tunisia is a party to the Lisbon Agreement, but not to its Geneva protocol and thus a large number of foreign Geographical indications is protected in Tunisia, while 7 Tunisian Geographical indications is protected in other Lisbon Agreement parties.

== Registered Geographical Indications ==
As of August 2021, 14 products are protected through Geographical Indications, 7 of which are also protected in the member states of the Lisbon Agreements. Most of them are Tunisian wines. The list of Tunisian GIs is shown below:

Country of origin	GI Name	Product type	Registration date	Type	Protection outside Tunisia
Tunisia	Côteaux d’Utique	wine		AOC	
Tunisia	Côteaux de Tebourba	wine	23 July 1973	AOC	Lisbon Agreement parties, except Iran
Tunisia	Deglet Nour Tunisienne	date	15 June 2012	IP	
Tunisia	تين دجبة / Figues de Djebba	fig	5 June 2012	AOC	Lisbon Agreement parties (but acceptance procedure still running)
Tunisia	Grand Cru Mornag	wine		AOC	
Tunisia	Grenade de Gabès	pomegranate	13 February 2009	IP	
Tunisia	Huile d’olive de Monastir	olive oil	2 December 2010	IP	
Tunisia	زيت زيتون تبرسق / Huile d’Olive Téboursouk	olive oil	8 January 2018	AOC	Lisbon Agreement parties, except Mexico and EU members
Tunisia	Kelibia/Vin Muscat de Kelibia/Muscat de Kelibia “A.O.C.”	wine	18 September 1958	AOC	Lisbon Agreement parties, except Iran
Tunisia	Menthe «El Ferch»	rosemary (dried leaves)	15 June 2012	IP	
Tunisia	Mornag V.D.Q.S	wine	19 May 1973	AOC (VDQS)	Lisbon Agreement parties, except Iran
Tunisia	Muscat de Thibar “A.O.C.”	Muscatel wine	18 September 1958	AOC	Lisbon Agreement parties, except Iran
Tunisia	Pomme de Sbiba	apple	13 February 2009	IP	
Tunisia	Sidi Salem	wine	23 July 1973	AOC	Lisbon Agreement parties, except Iran

== Protection of foreign geographical indications ==
Tunisia is a party to the Lisbon Agreement for the Protection of Appellations of Origin and their International Registration since 1973. Under the agreement states an submit geographical indications for protection in all member states. Protection is granted, unless a member state objects within 1 year. As Tunisia has not objected to any of the geographical indications, all 933 (as of September 2021) geographical indications registered over 1 year ago are protected in Tunisia.
