= Quantum Cable =

- Owners: Quantum Cable
- CEO: Nasos Ktorides
- Project Director: George Killas
- Landing points: 1. Bilbao, Spain; 2. Saint-Hilaire-de-Riez,France; 3. Genoa, Italy; 4. Kofinou, Cyprus
- Total length: 7,700 km
- Design capacity: 200Tb/s
- Website: http://www.quantum-cable.com/

The Quantum Cable is a planned 7,700 km submarine communications cable system connecting Asia with Europe through the Mediterranean Sea. Quantum Cable will connect Cyprus to Italy, France and Bilbao, Spain. The Quantum Cable will be laid simultaneously with the 2,000 MW EuroAfrica Interconnector.

== Description ==
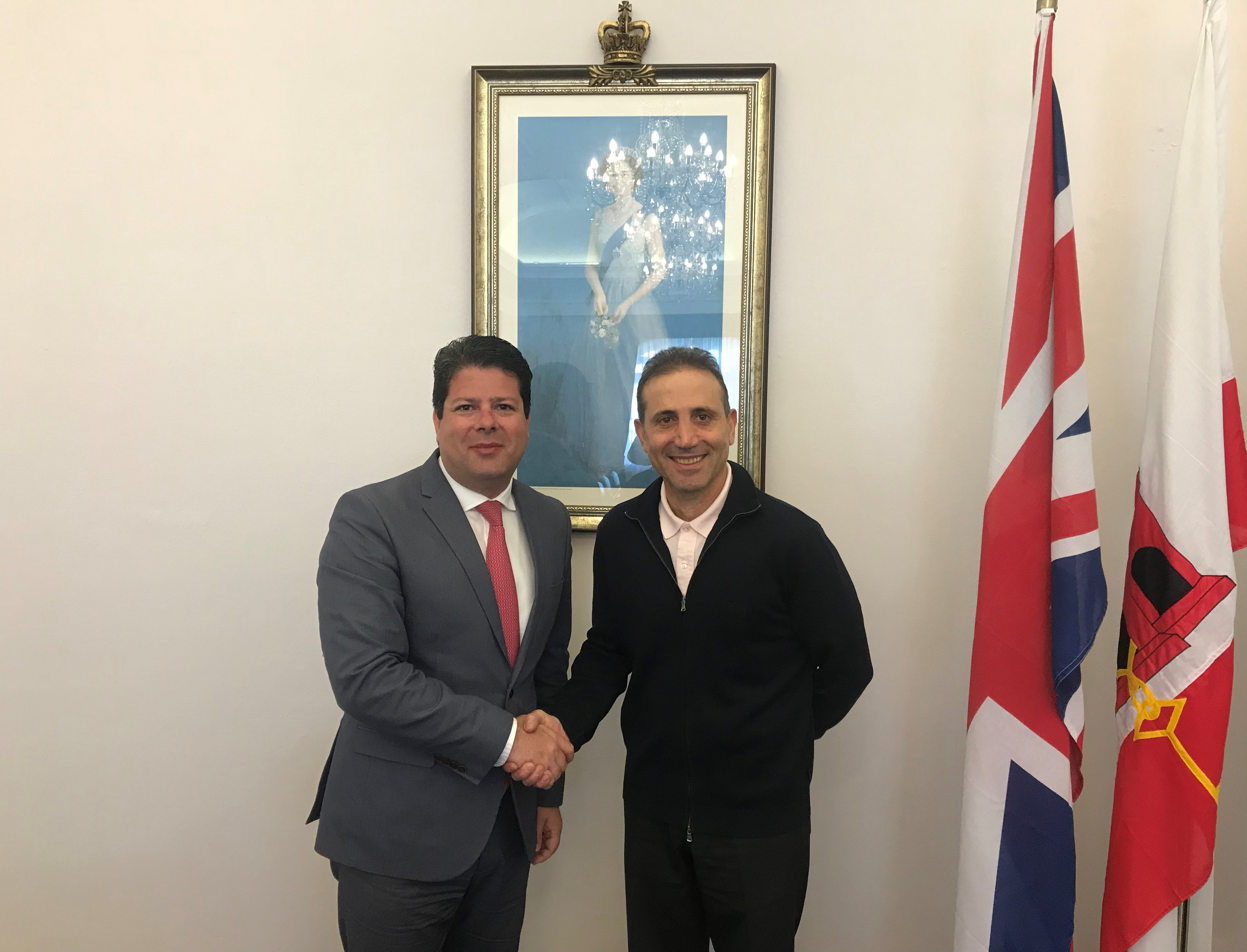
Quantum Cable CEO Nasos Ktorides (right) with the Chief Minister of Gibraltar, Fabian Picardo

The Quantum Cable is a 7,700-kilometre (4,800 mi) subsea ultra high speed fiber-optic cable system connecting the Middle East to Europe via the Mediterranean Sea. It will connect Cyprus to Italy, France and Bilbao, Spain. The cable terminal points will be in Bilbao, Spain, where it is expected to be connected with transatlantic MAREA cable.

The Quantum Cable cable system deploys transmission technology at an ultra-fast broadband speed of 200 Tbit/s (terabits per second), equivalent to the MAREA cable. That capacity is equivalent to streaming 80 million HD video conference calls at the same time. With that speed 60 percent of the world's internet traffic could be handled at peak time. It is expected that the cable will have 40 times more capacity than the average capacity of existing internet cables on the Mediterranean. Therefore, it will support high speed for Data centers, Cloud providers and Online services.

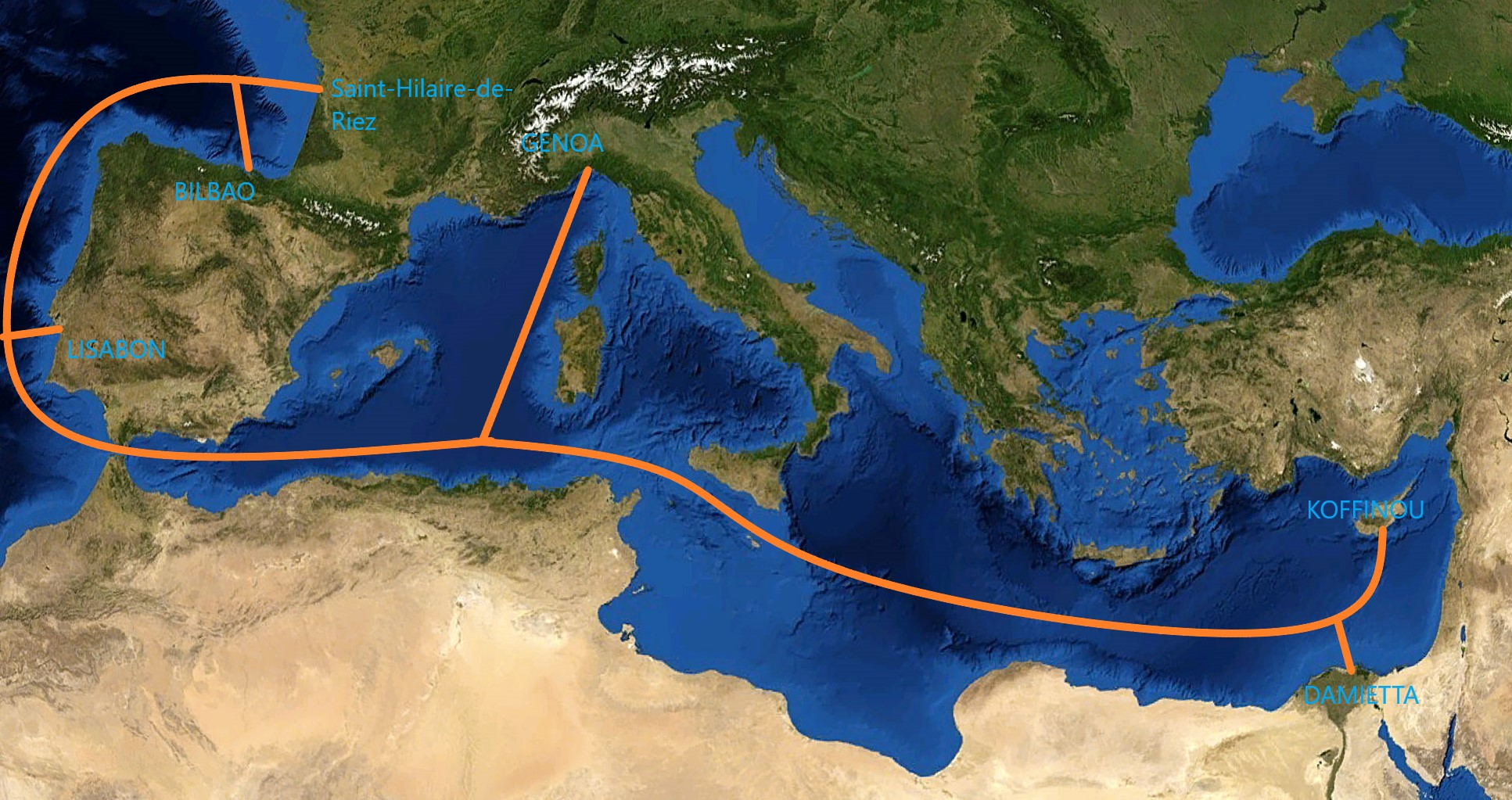
Route of Quantum Cable

Chief Minister of Gibraltar Fabian Picardo in meeting with CEO Quantum Cable Nasos Ktorides expressed support for the Quantum Cable and interest in the creation of the cable landing station in Gibraltar.

The Quantum Cable will be laid at depths of 3,000 meters at same time and in parallel with the 2,000 MW EuroAfrica Interconnector. Former Cyprus Foreign Minister (1997—2003, 2013—1 March 2018) and head of the European Parliament Foreign Affairs Working group, Ioannis Kasoulides, has joined the Quantum Cable on March 29, 2018 as Chairman of the Strategic Council. The former Cyprus Minister of Transport, Communications and Works Marios Demetriades also joined Strategic Council of Quantum Cable.

The Quantum Cable will minimize the dependence of Mediterranean and Middle Eastern countries from the PoPs of West and Central Europe. The capacity of the cable will accelerate deployment of fast mobile and fixed networks. Providing fast connectivity will maximize reliability of the existing European and Middle Eastern internet backbone network. The Quantum Cable will also facilitate the installation and hosting of data centers.

By connecting major carrier-neutral PoPs in Cyprus, Italy, France and Spain, the Quantum Cable clients can choose their preferred back-haul providers available in these PoPs or in cable landing stations in the Middle East, North Africa and Europe.

The cost of the project is estimated at US$200 million and will be undertaken by the Quantum Cable.

== Landing points ==
1. Bilbao, Spain
2. Saint-Hilaire-de-Riez, France
3. Genoa, Italy
4. Kofinou, Cyprus

== See also ==
- MAREA
- AAE-1
