= Ministry of Electricity and Renewable Energy =

Government ministry of Egypt

Coordinates: 30°4′15″N 31°17′22″E

Arab Republic of Egypt Ministry of Electricity and Renewable Energy
- وزارة الكهرباء والطاقة المتجددة
- Emblem of Egypt

Agency overview
- Jurisdiction: Government of Egypt
- Headquarters: New Administrative Capital, Cairo Governorate
- Agency executive: Mohamed Shaker El-Markabi, Minister
- Website: www.moee.gov.eg

The Ministry of Electricity and Renewable Energy of Egypt is the government ministry in charge of managing and regulating the generation, transmission, and distribution of electricity in Egypt. Its headquarters are in Cairo. The current minister is Mohamed Shaker. The ministry was established in 1964 with presidential decree No. 147.

== Electric power stations ==
An agreement was made with Siemens, a German company, to implement power stations in Beni Suef, the New Administrative Capital, and Borollos by mid 2018.

== High dams ==
The Aswan Dam, inaugurated in 1971, "can generate 10 billion kilowatt-hours annually.".

A new high dam to pump and store water to produce electricity in Ataka was in the works in mid 2017 in conjunction with Sinohydro, a Chinese company.

== Nuclear power plant ==
In 2015, Egypt began negotiations with Russian company Rosatom, for building a nuclear power plant in Dabaa and by the end of 2016, the ministry and the company were in their final negotiations on the deal. By 2017, negotiations were completed.

== Petrol discovery ==
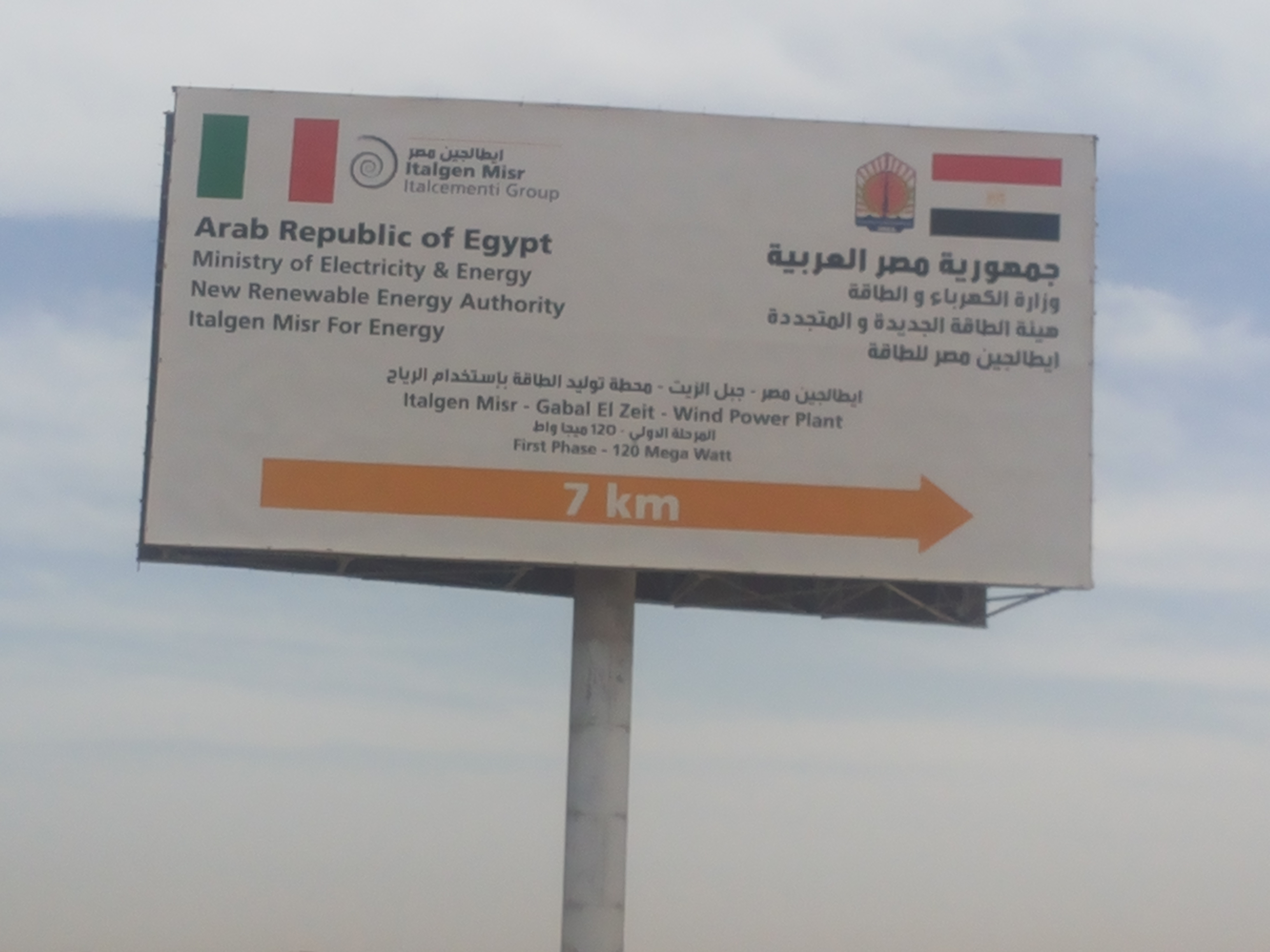
Ministry of Egypt and Eni

Eni, an Italian company is working on the large petrol field discovered in Egypt in 2015.

== Coal-fired plant ==
As anticipated a year before, in September, 2018, a 4.4 billion agreement was signed for the building of a 6.6 GW coal-power plant in Hamrawein, Egypt and would take at least six years to complete and become operational. The project was mothballed in 2020.

== Ministers ==
#	Name	Term	
#	Name	Start	End
1	Mohamed Ezzat Salama	March 1964	September 1965
2	Mustafa Khalil	October 1965	September 1966
3	Mahmoud Younis	September 1966	June 1967
4	Mohammed Sidqi Suleiman	June 1967	March 1968
5	Helmy Mohamed Saeed	November 1970	May 1971
6	Ahmed Sultan	September 1974	April 1975
7	Mustafa Kamal Sabri	October 1978	May 1980
8	Mohamed Maher Abaza	May 1980	October 1999
9	Dr. Saidi on	October 1999	November 2001
10	Hassan Younis	November 2001	August 2012
11	Mahmoud Saad Balbaa	August 2012	January 2013
12	Ahmed Mustafa Imam	January 2013	February 2014
13	Mohamed Shaker El-Markabi	February 2014	Incumbent

== See also ==
- Energy in Egypt
- Egyptian Electricity Holding Company
- Cabinet of Egypt
- Aswan Dam
