= Mahmoud Balbaa =

Egyptian engineer and politician

Minister of Electricity and Energy
- In office 3 August 2012 – 5 January 2013
- Prime Minister: Hisham Qandil
- Preceded by: Hassan Younes
- Succeeded by: Ahmed Imam

Personal details
- Born: 30 January 1952 (age 74) Damanhour, El Behera, Egypt
- Party: National Democratic Party (Formerly); Independent
- Children: 3 boys

Mahmoud Saad Balbaa (born 30 January 1952) is an Egyptian engineer, businessman and former minister of electricity and energy in the Qandil cabinet.

== Career ==
Balbaa was a member of the now disbanded National Democratic Party. An engineer by training, he was appointed head of the Egyptian Electric Holding Company in 2011. Therefore, he was the man in direct charge of the electricity of the country. He stated in February 2012 that Egypt was ready to supply additional power to the Gaza Strip if the Palestinian Authority president Mahmoud Abbas would sign off on the deal. He also worked closely with the former minister of electricity and energy Hassan Younes to realize Banha's electricity generation projects, which would be provided and installed by a coalition of Japanese companies, such as Hitachi and Toyota.

He was appointed the Egypt's minister of electricity and energy in August 2012, replacing Hassan Younes. He was one of the senior figures in Egyptian holding companies and independent figures appointed to the ministerial post in the cabinet. Balbaa was replaced by Ahmed Imam in a cabinet reshuffle on 5 January 2012.
