= Hassan Younes =

Egyptian engineer and politician (born 1943)

Minister of Electricity and Energy
- In office November 2001 – July 2012
- Prime Minister: Kamal Ganzouri; Essam Sharaf; Ahmed Shafik
- Succeeded by: Mahmoud Balbaa

Personal details
- Born: 21 February 1943 (age 83)

Hassan Younes (born 21 February 1943) is an Egyptian engineer and politician, who is the former long-term minister of electricity and energy. He was in office during the Mobarak era and also, in two interim governments of post-Mobarak era.

== Early life and education ==
Younes was born on 21 February 1943. He holds bachelor of science (1965) and master of science degrees (1975) in electrical power engineering. He also obtained a PhD in electrical power engineering in 1985.

== Career ==
Younes started his career working as an engineer from 1965 to 1978. Then he served as the representative of Egypt's electricity authority in the US from 1978 to 1979. Next he began to work at Egypt's national energy control centre in 1979. He was appointed general director of operation system in 1983 and inspector general of the national energy control in 1988. He began to serve as the board chairman of the Electric Holding Company in 2001. In November 2001, he was appointed minister of electricity and energy. From October 2009 to 3 January 2010, he briefly served as acting transport minister when Mohamed Mansour resigned from office on 27 October 2009.

Younes also served as energy minister in the cabinet led by Ahmed Shafik. He was also appointed to the post in the Kamal Ganzouri's interim cabinet in December 2011. His term lasted until July 2012.
