= Tunisian wine =

Wine making in Tunisia

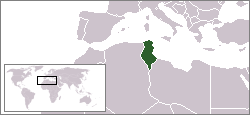
Location of Tunisia.

Tunisian wine has a long history dating back to the Antiquity like most Mediterranean countries with the Phoenicians and Carthage .

The agronomist Mago that lived in the city of Carthage, wrote a treaty about agronomy and viticulture, from which its techniques are still used until this day. Despite the arrival of a Muslim power since the 7th century AD, viticulture and wine production never quite disappeared from Tunisia.

Rosé wine accounts for a large proportion of the Tunisian production.

== History ==
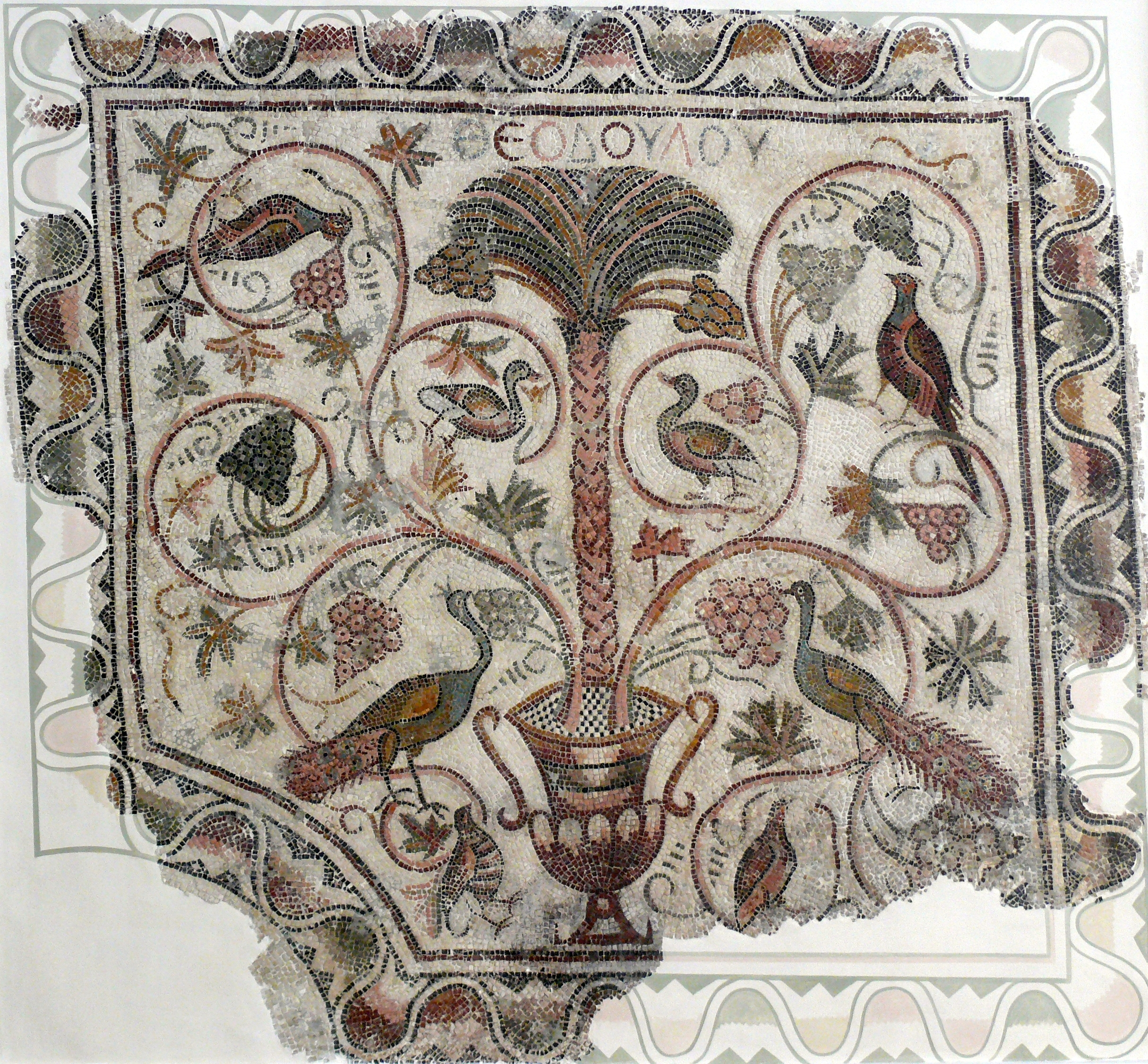
Vine and palm

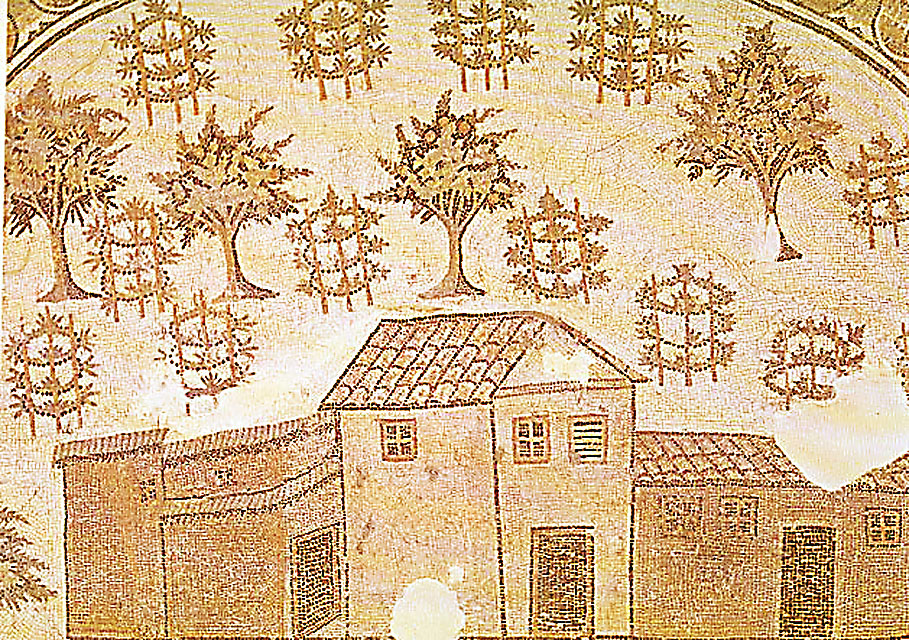
Mosaic of the villa rustica of Tabarka

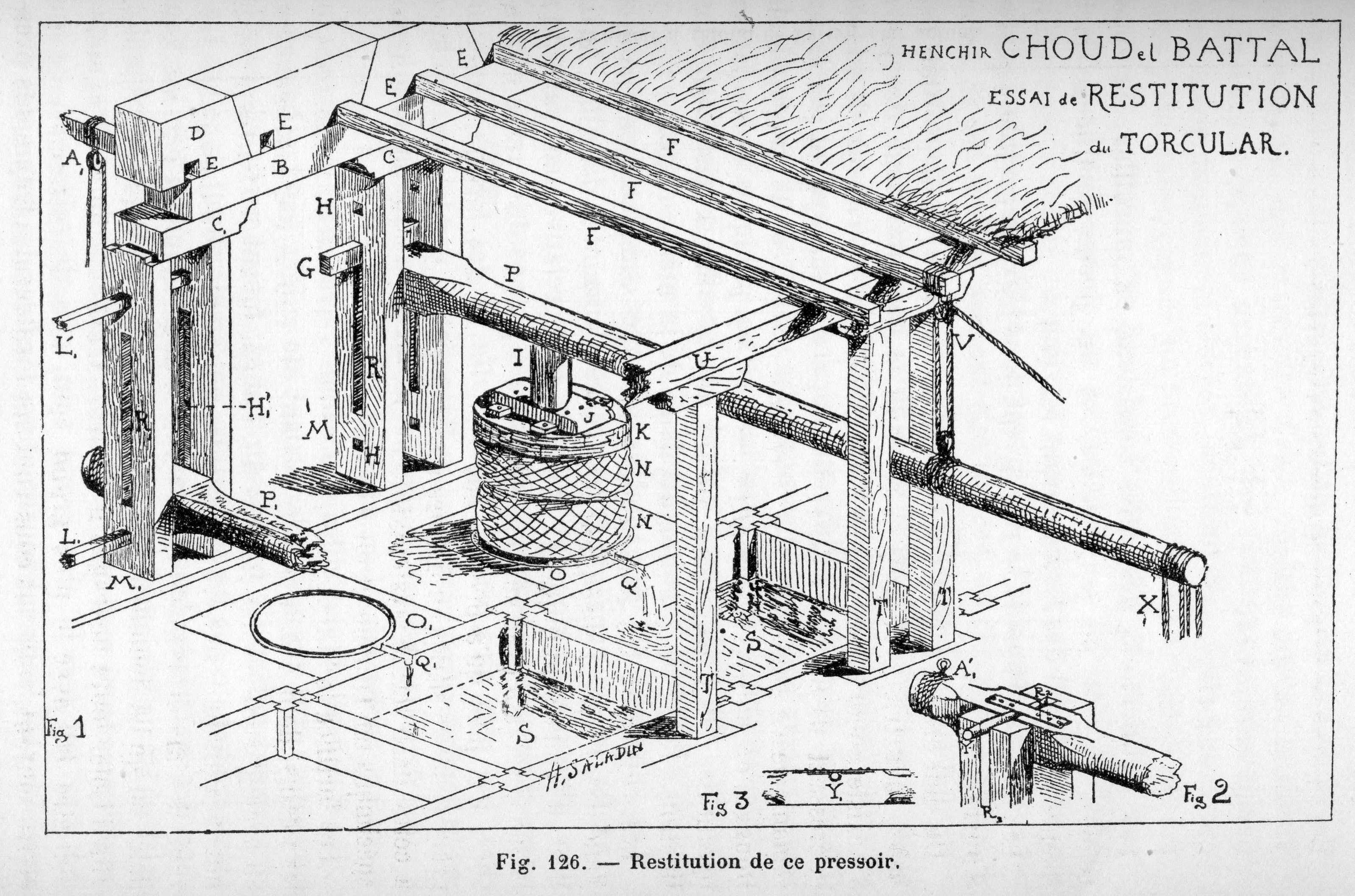
Reconstruction of a wine press near Fériana

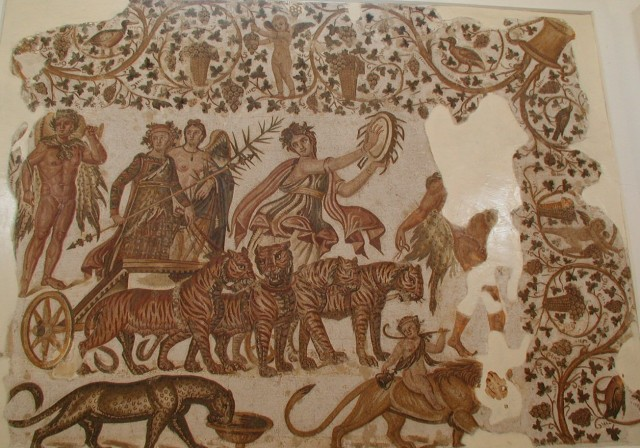
Mosaic of the Triumph of Bacchus in Sousse Archaeological Museum

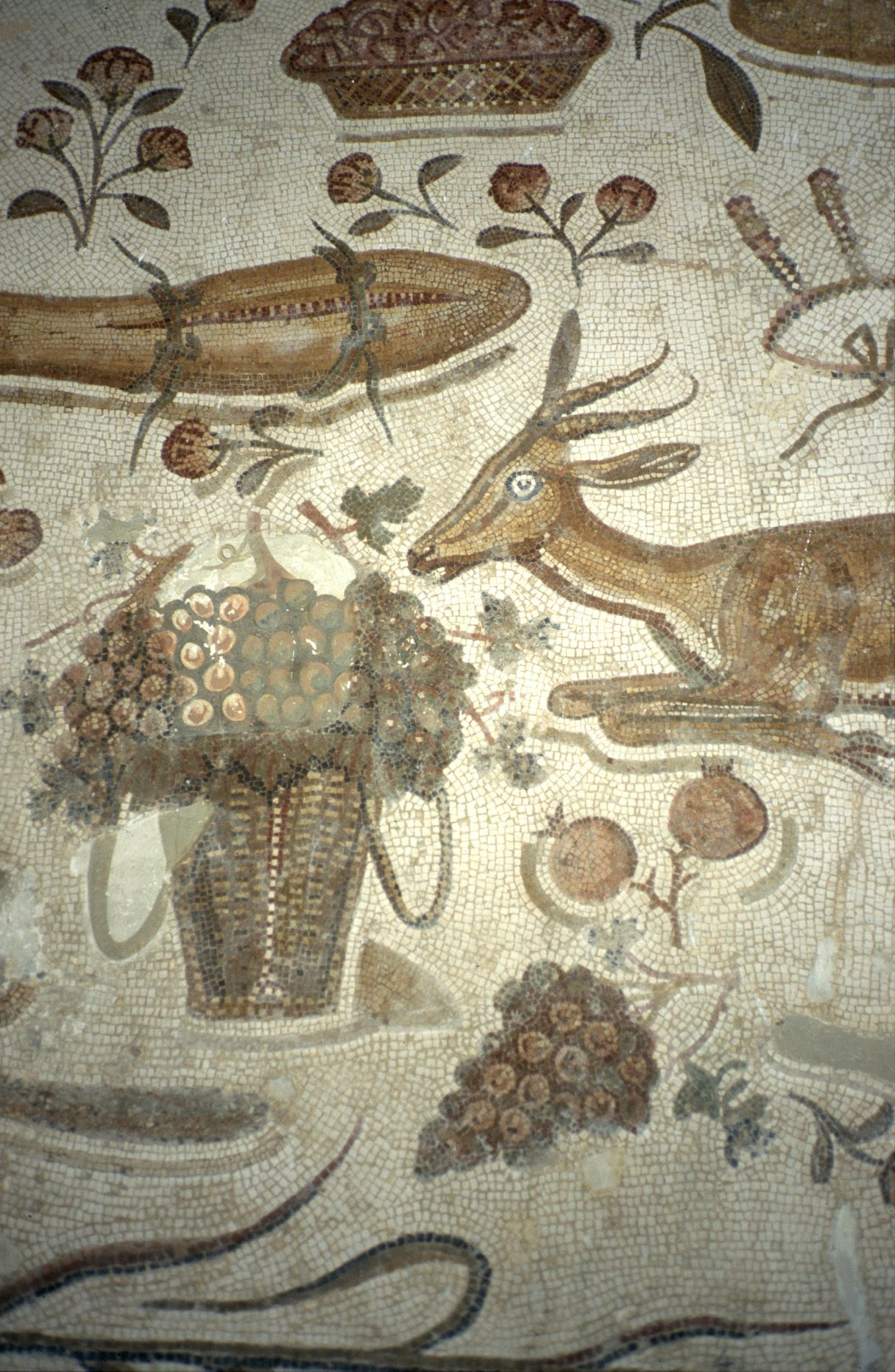
Basket of grapes

Wine production in today's Tunisia was probably introduced by the Phoenicians when Carthage was established. The Carthaginian agronomist Mago wrote on viticulture, and his works, which were later translated from Punic to Latin, were quoted by later Roman writers such as Columella.

Wine production continued after the Romans occupied Carthage in 146 BC. After Tunisia's conquest by Arabs in the 8th century AD, wine production was reduced but not eliminated.

Subsequent to the French conquest of Tunisia in 1881, large-scale wine production was introduced into the country, similar to the other North African countries. After Tunisia's independence in 1956, wine production continued but lack of expertise became a problem, and vineyard area slowly decreased.

From the late 1990s, Tunisia has seen foreign investment in its wine industry from several European countries, and production is slowly increasing in the 2000s.

== Production ==
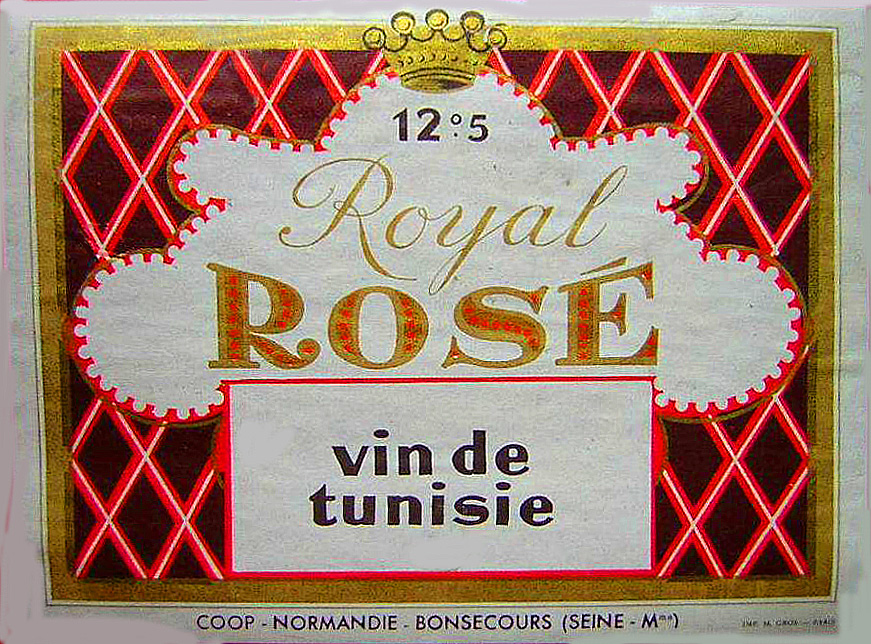
An old wine label from a Tunisian rosé wine sold in France.

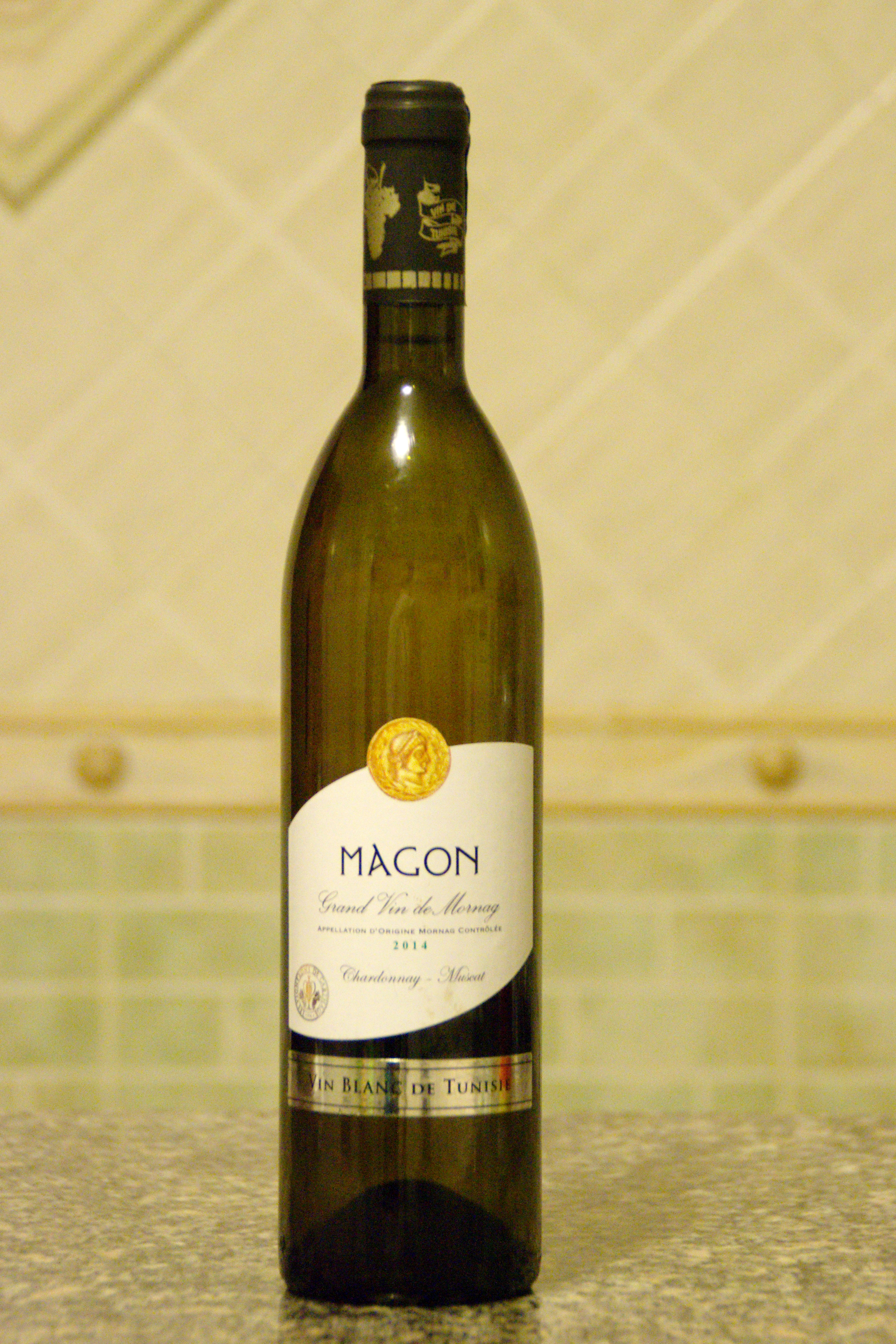
White wine (2014) 'Magon', AOC Mornag

In 2008, there were 31,000 hectares (77,000 acres) of vineyards in Tunisia, of which just over half was dedicated to wine, and the rest mostly to the production of table grapes. In the early 2000s, the wine production in Tunisia consisted of 60–70 per cent rosé, 25–30 per cent red and under 10 per cent white.

Tunisia produces annually between 300 and 400 thousands hectoliters of wine, growing by 40% since 2002 with a peak of 600 thousands hectoliters in 2007. The yearly Tunisian local consumption averages 2.2 liters (0.48 imperial gallons; 0.58 U.S. gallons) by citizen.

Exportation amounts up to 40% of the revenues of the sector reaching $40.3 million in 2009. Germany and France are the main clients, with some quantities also exported to Switzerland, Belgium, the United States, Canada and some countries of eastern Europe like Russia. The production is commercialized at 70% with the label "AOC" among which 20% are further labelled « premier cru ».

== Wine regions ==
Most of the Tunisian wine production is located in Cap Bon and the surrounding area. Tunisia has an Appellation Contrôlée (AOC) system consisting of the following seven AOCs, which are protected under the geographical indications in Tunisia and internationally in the parties to the Lisbon Agreement for the Protection of Appellations of Origin and their International Registration (except Iran).

- Grand Cru Mornag
- Mornag
- Coteau de Tébourba
- Sidi Salem
- Kélibia
- Thibar
- Côteaux d’Utique

== Grape varieties ==
Tunisia shares most of its common grape varieties with southern France with local varieties. Common grape varieties (which have local variations) for rosé and red wine include Carignan, Mourvèdre, Cinsaut, Alicante Bouschet, Grenache, Syrah and Merlot, and for white wines Muscat of Alexandria, Chardonnay and Pedro Ximenez.

== See also ==
- Winemaking
- Tunisian cuisine
