= Thibaris =

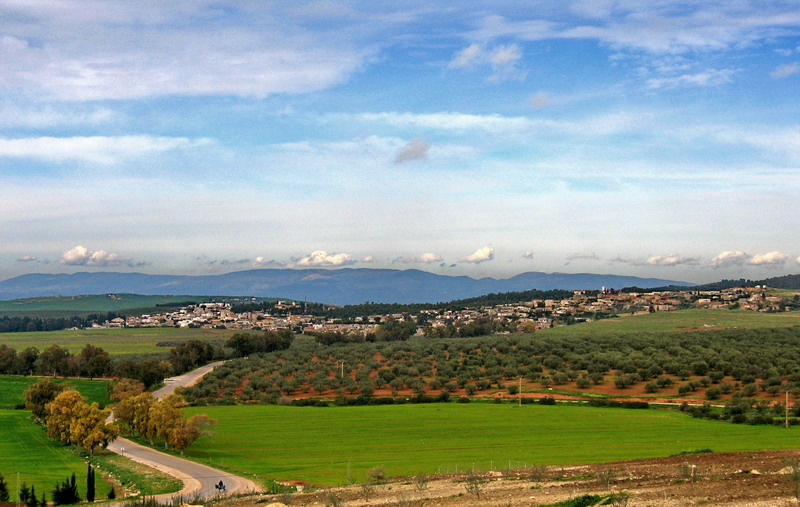
File:Thibar

Thibaris was a town in the late Roman province of Africa Proconsularis.

== Location ==
An inscription fixes the exact site at the ruins now called Henshir Hamamet, in a plain watered by the Wady Tibar, which has retained the name of the town. These ruins are situated about five miles north-east of Djebba, near the Djebel Gorra Tunaiai. There are galena and calamine mines at Djebba. The former were worked even in ancient times and are mentioned in a letter from Saint Cyprian to the faithful of Thibaris (Ep. lvi). The chief ruins are those of an aqueduct and a Christian church.

== Bishopric ==
The bishopric of Thibaris was a suffragan see of the metropolitan see of Carthage, the capital of the province.

Two bishops of Thibaris are known:

- Vincent, present at the Council of Carthage in 256;
- Victor, at the Conference of Carthage in 411, where his rival was the Donatist, Victorian.
