= Telxius =

Global telecommunications infrastructure company

Telxius Telecom S.A.
- Type: Subsidiary
- Industry: Telecommunications
- Founded: 2016; 10 years ago in Madrid, Spain
- Founder: Telefónica
- Headquarters: Madrid, Spain
- Area served: Worldwide
- Key people: Mario Martín (CEO)
- Products: Submarine fiber cable, telecommunication tower
- Owner: Telefónica
- Parent: Telefónica Infra
- ASN: 12956
- Peering policy: Selective
- Website: telxius.com

Telxius Telecom S.A. is a global telecommunications infrastructure company created in 2016, owned by Telefónica Infra, a subsidiary of Spanish telecommunications company Telefónica.

== History ==
On February 21, 2017, Telefónica announced an agreement reached with KKR for the sale of up to 40% of Telxius, for a total amount of 1,275 million euros; 12.75 euros per share.

In 2018, BRUSA, a new maritime cable of almost 11,000 kilometers that connects Brazil, Puerto Rico and the US, started operating; as well as MAREA, a cable that connects the United States and Europe in collaboration with Microsoft and Facebook.

On July 27, 2019, Telefónica reached an agreement with Pontegadea, investment vehicle of Amancio Ortega, for the sale of 9.99% of Telxius for a total amount of 378.8 million euros. The transaction involves a price of 15.2 euros per Telxius share.

In 2021, Telefonica agreed to sell the European and Latin American tower divisions of Telxius to American Tower, comprising approximately 31,000 communications sites, for $9.6 billion. The sold sites were located in Spain, Germany, Argentina, Brazil, Chile, and Peru.

In February 2026, Telxius named Antonio Ledesma as new CEO. Ledesma succeeded Mario Martín, who was recently appointed as head of Telefónica’s office in the United Kingdom.

== Infrastructure ==
With an international cable network, Telxius manages 100,000 kilometers of submarine fiber optics connecting Europe and America, of which more than 31,000 kilometers are owned.

It includes, among other infrastructures, SAM-1, the submarine cable system that connects the United States with Central America and South America since 2000; PCCS (Pacific Caribbean Cable System), which links the US, Puerto Rico, Curaçao, Colombia, Panama and Ecuador; and Unisur, which connects Uruguay and Argentina.

== Shareholders ==
=== Shareholders ===
On February 21, 2017, Telefónica announced an agreement reached with KKR for the sale of up to 40% of Telxius, for a total amount of 1,275 million euros; €12.75 per share.

On July 27, 2019, Telefónica reached an agreement with Pontegadea, Amancio Ortega's investment vehicle, for the sale of 9.99% of Telxius for a total amount of 378.8 million euros. The transaction represents a price of 15.2 euros per Telxius share.

In February 2022, Telefónica and Pontegadea bought 40% of Telxius from KKR. The acquisition is carried out for an estimated amount of 215.7 million euros, pending, among others, the corresponding adjustments derived from the sale of the Telxius tower business to American Tower in 2021.

Telxius shareholding
Shareholder	Capital
Telefónica	70,00 %
Pontegadea	30,00 %
