= El Kureimat Power Plant =

Gas power plant in Egypt

Coordinates: 29.272°N 31.224°E

El Kureimat Power Plant is a gas power plant suitated in Egypt. It uses natural gas and mazout as the fuel. The contract also includes several modernisation and upgrade measures for the eight gas turbines at three power stations.
