= Djebba =

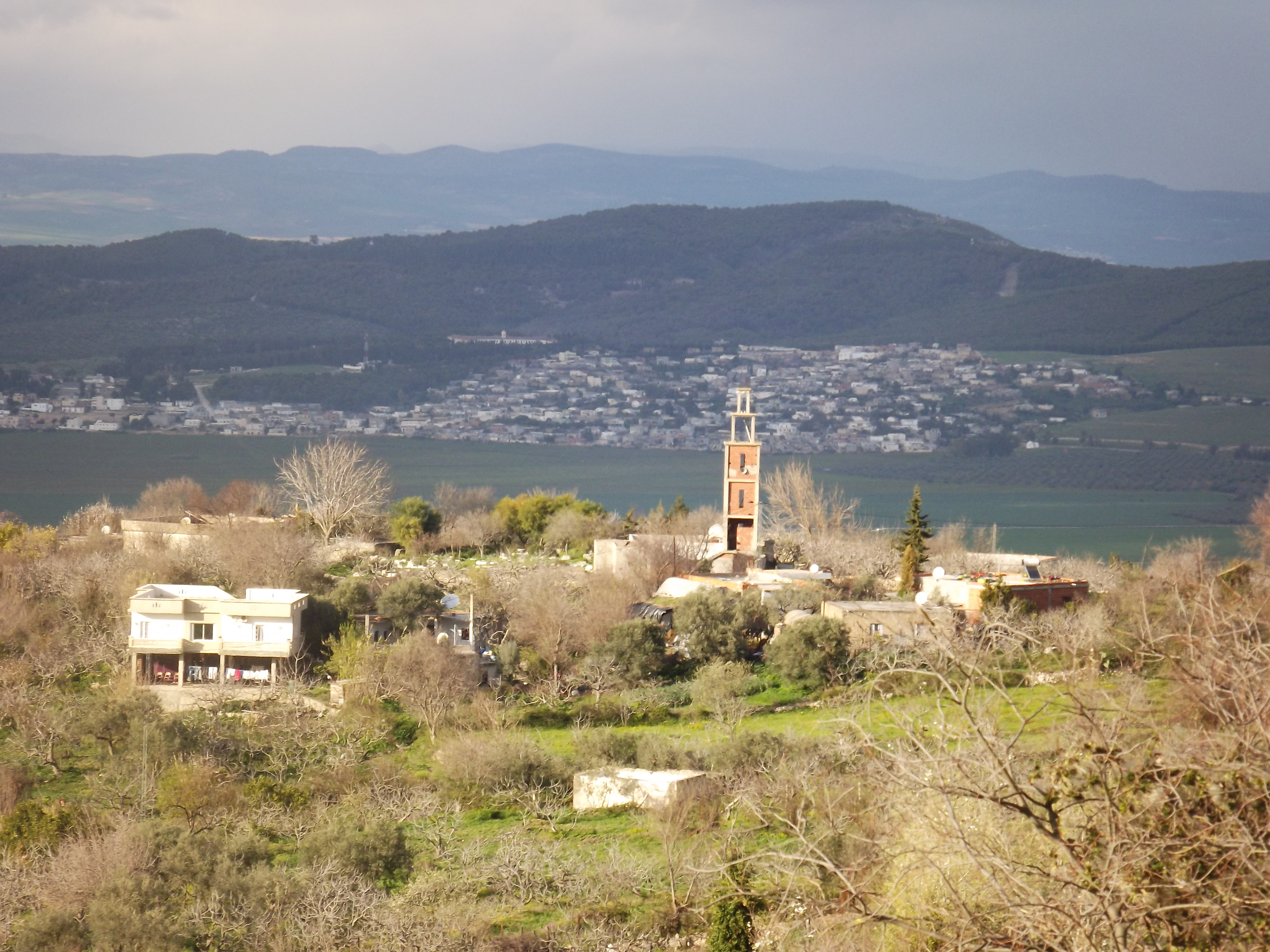
Djebba

Djebba, also known as Thigibba Bure, is a town and an ancient archaeological site is located in Bājah, Tunisia. Djebba is an archaeological/prehistoric site in Tunisia located at latitude: 36°28'32.45" longitude: 9°4'53.54" in the Béja Governorate of northwestern Tunisia. The estimated terrain elevation above sea level is 355 metres located below the slopes of Djebel Gorra, 700 meters above sea level. Djebba also has a national park, which is the subject of a development project

Nearby towns include Sidi Bou Zacouma, Sainte-Marie and Djebel Goraa and El Aroussa, Djebel Touila. The ruins of another Roman civitas (town) of Thibaris are five kilometers to the north.

The site is 355 meters above sea level and in ancient times the town was located in the hills overlooking the fertile Bagrada River Valley, and may have been a civitas (town) in the Roman province of Africa Proconsularis.

== History ==
=== Roman ===
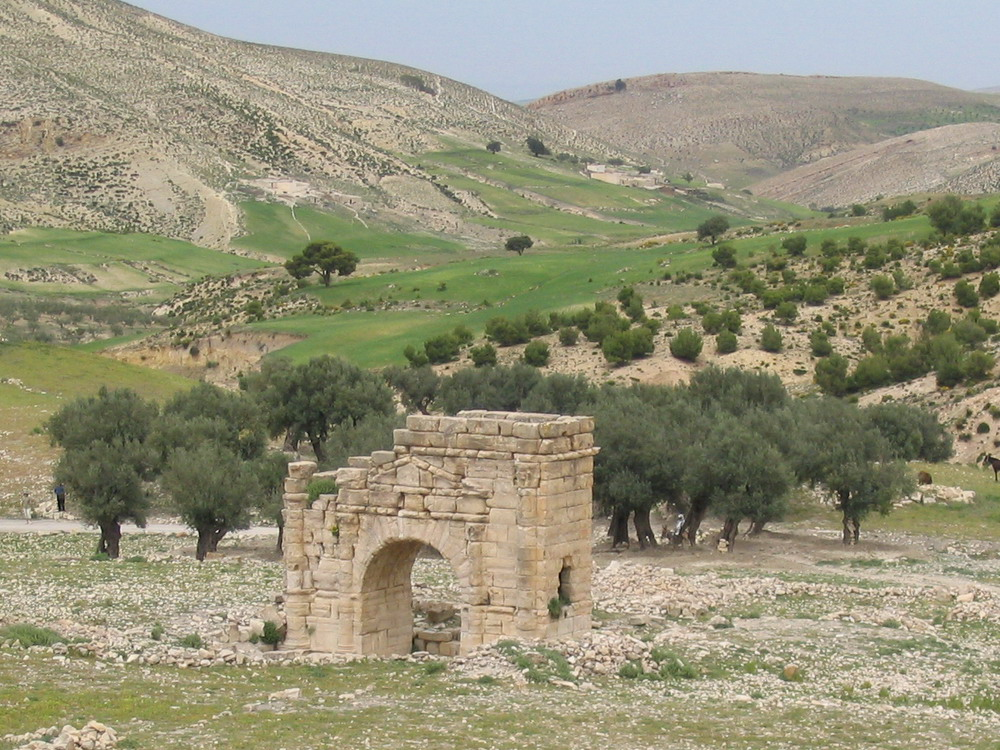
Ruins at Djebba

The name of the town (Thigibba Bure) was derived from a prior Roman town on the same site. During the Roman and Byzantine-era it was a civitas of Africa Proconsularis Province from 330 BC – 640 AD The town has numerous ruins, inscription Triumphal arch and an extensive necropolis excavated by the French. The site includes many megalithic tombs of pre-Punic construction and may indicate a Numidian royal city at one time. The commanding position overlooking the surrounding plains would make such a location ideal for this.

The ruins of Thigibba Bure is located 4 km from Sidi Bou Zacouma and Mount Djebel Goraa at 36°28'32.4N and 9°4'53.5E. Among the Roman-era ruins are well preserved public toilets and a triumphal arch. in which it is written « SI QUI HIC URINAM FECERIT HABEBIT MARTEM IRATUM », meaning "If someone urinates here, he will have Mars irritated".

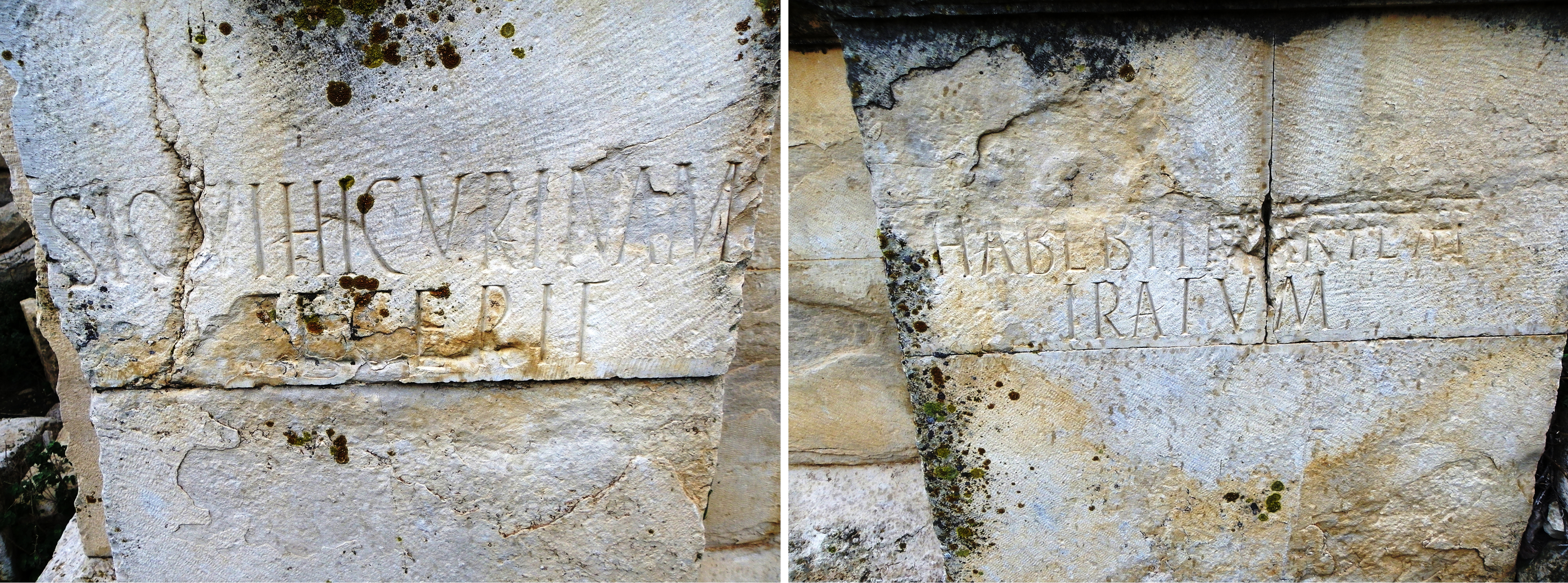
SI QUI HIC URINAM FECERIT HABEBIT MARTEM IRATUM

There are also Roman-era ruins 3 km north at Henchir Thibar and other prehistoric sites at Kouch Batra 7 km away and at Sidi Abdallah Melliti 9 km away. There are also several springs in the area.

Djebba is also a prehistoric archaeological site in Tunisia.

== Bishopric ==
The town was the seat of an ancient bishopric and a centre in the Donatist controversy. Only two bishops are known the rival bishops Rogatianus 401-411 (Catholic) and Victorius fl. 411 (Donatist).

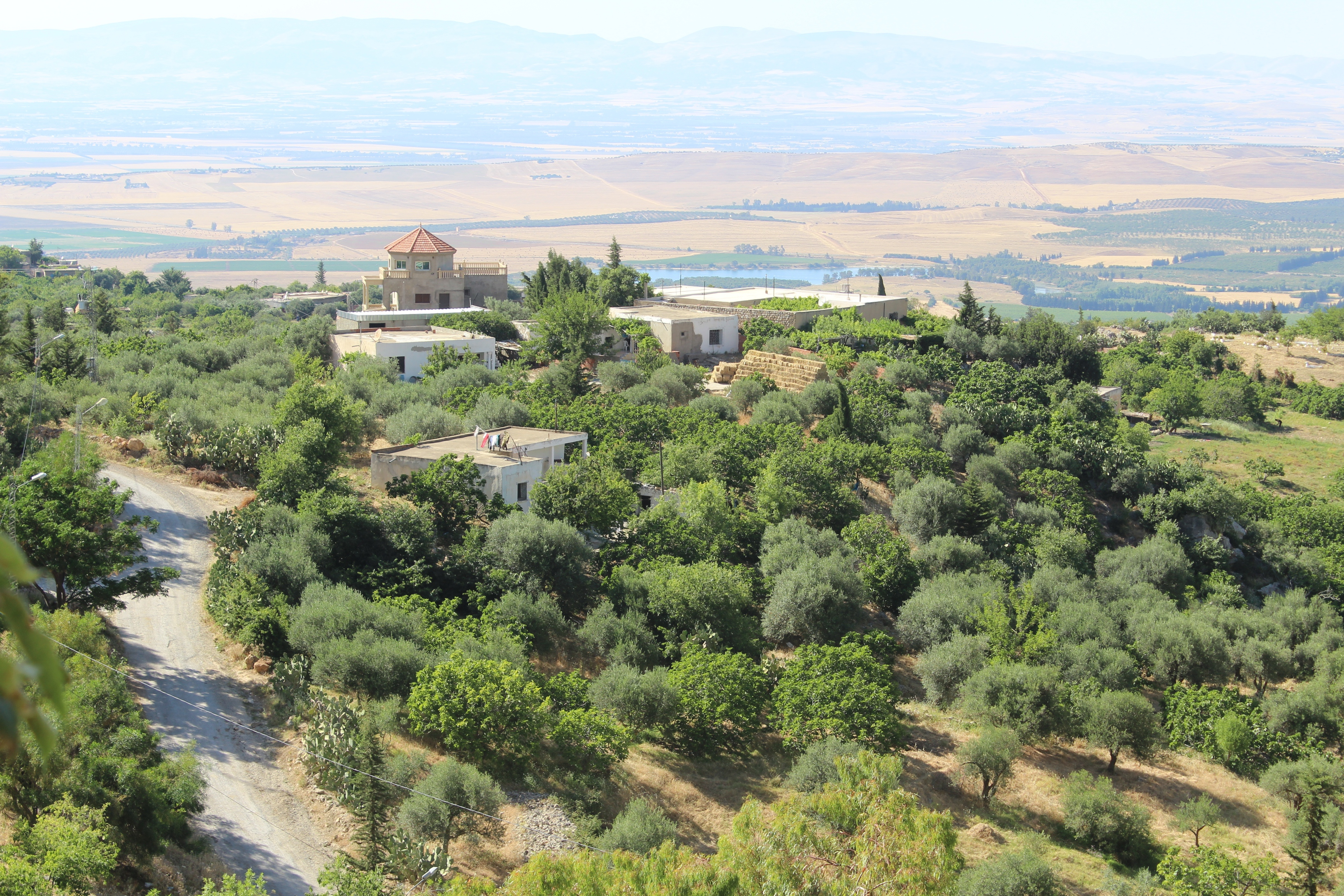
Djebba

The bishopric of Thigibba remains a titular see of the Roman Catholic Church. Known bishops include:

- Joseph Dupont
- Kidanè-Maryam Cassà (1930–1951)
- Lionel Audet (1952–1989)
- Pierre François Marie Joseph Duprey (12 Dec 1989 Appointed – 13 May 2007)
- Matthias Heinrich (since 18 Feb 2009)

== Economy ==
Djebba has a population of 3576 inhabitants at the 2004 count and a postal code of 9042. The economy of the town is agricultural with the most crops in Djebba being figs, quince (3 types) and olives (15 species), and the region contains 560 medicinal plants.
