= MAREA =

Submarine transatlantic communications cable

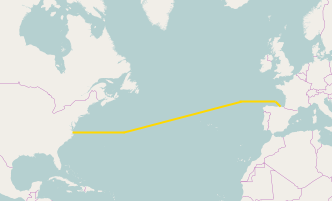
The MAREA cable connects the United States and Spain

MAREA is a 6,605 km (4,104 miles) long transatlantic communications cable connecting the United States with Spain. It is owned and funded by Microsoft and Facebook, but constructed and operated by Telxius, a subsidiary of the Spanish telecom company Telefónica. As of 2019 it was the "highest-capacity submarine cable in the world" with a system design capacity of 200 terabits per second.

== History ==
In May 2016, Microsoft, Facebook, and Telxius announced the MAREA project, saying that it would provide the Eastern United States, most of whose internet traffic flows through New York, with "a more efficient path not only to Europe but to Africa, the Middle East, and even Asia". According to Microsoft's Director of Global Network Strategy for Cloud Infrastructure and Operations, one impetus for the project was sparked by the service disruptions caused by Hurricane Sandy in October 2012.

Construction began shortly afterwards, in August 2016, and was completed in September 2017, connecting Virginia Beach, Virginia, in the United States, with Sopelana, a town near Bilbao, Spain. It began operations in February 2018.

In January 2019, Telxius announced that AWS had signed an IRU agreement to use one of MAREA's eight fiber pairs (Microsoft and Facebook each own two pairs, and Telxius will have three pairs for other customers and its own use.

== Operation ==
Telxius was responsible for the construction and operation of the cable, which connects Virginia Beach, Virginia, in the United States, with Sopelana, Spain (near Bilbao).

The cable was initially expected to have a transmission speed of 160 terabits per second. (Specifically, 8 fiber pairs * 25 DWDM channels * 400 Gbit/s per single carrier (16-QAM modulation) = 160 Tbit/s). But in 2019, a research team reported they had generated signaling speeds of 26.2 Tbit/s (per fiber pair) on MAREA cable, 20 percent higher than believed feasible when the cable was designed.

The cable weighs approximately 4.65 million kilograms, and is composed of eight pairs of fiber-optic cable bundles.

The term "marea" means "tide" in Spanish.

== See also ==
- Dark fibre
- Submarine communications cable
- Transatlantic communications cable
