= Egyptian Electricity Holding Company =

Egyptian utility company

- Company type: Public utility, Holding company
- Industry: Electricity production, Electricity transmission, Electricity distribution
- Predecessor: Egyptian Electricity Authority
- Founded: 2000; 26 years ago
- Headquarters: El-Qobba Bridge, El Weili, Cairo, Egypt
- Services: Electricity
- Revenue: ▲EGP182.5 billion (2021); EGP164.4 billion (2020)
- Total assets: ▲EGP417.6 billion (2021); EGP414.4 billion (2020)
- Total equity: ▲EGP91.5 billion (2021); EGP45.7 billion (2020)
- Number of employees: ▼148 649 (2021); 152 711 (2020)
- Parent: Government of Egypt
- Website: www.eehc.gov.eg

The Egyptian Electricity Holding Company is a state-owned company for electrical power generation, transmission and distribution in Egypt. It was established in 2000 and works in the field of production, transmission and distribution of electricity in Egypt. It supervises production stations, transmission networks, and electricity distribution networks, and includes 17 subsidiaries.

== History ==
The Egyptian Electricity Holding Company was established in 1976 under the name “Egypt Electricity Authority” to be responsible for all electrical power stations and transmission and distribution networks ، In the same year under the name “Rural Electricity Authority” to be responsible for all electrical power stations and transmission and distribution networks in rural zones in all over Egypt. In 1984, the “Public Sector Authority for Electrical Power Distribution” was established, and it assumed supervision of electricity distribution companies.

In 1998, the affiliation of the electricity distribution companies was transferred to the Egyptian Electricity Authority, and the seven electricity regions and electricity distribution companies were merged into seven joint-stock companies. In 2000, Law No. 164 was issued transforming the Egyptian Electricity Authority into the Egyptian Electricity Holding Company, which became affiliated with five electricity production companies. Seven electricity distribution companies and one electricity transmission and control company. In 2001, the holding company and its subsidiaries were restructured until the number of subsidiaries became seventeen companies, six production companies, the Egyptian Electricity Transmission Company, nine distribution companies and the medical services of the electricity company.

== See also ==
- Ministry of Electricity and Renewable Energy (Egypt)
