= Benban Solar Park =

Solar park in Egypt

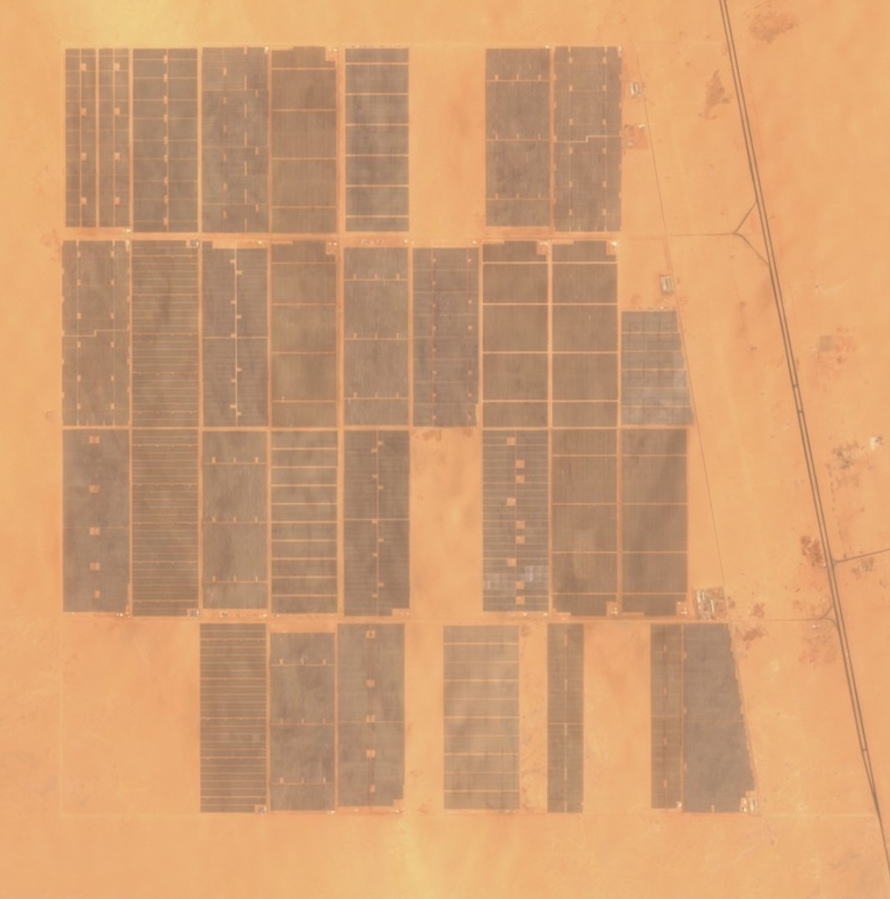
- Official name: حديقة بنبان للطاقة الشمسية
- Country: Egypt
- Location: Benban, Aswan Governorate
- Coordinates: 24°27′21.6″N 32°44′20.4″E
- Status: Completed November 2019
- Construction began: February–March 2018
- Commission date: 2019; 7 years ago
- Construction cost: US$4 billion
- Owners: New and Renewable Energy Authority (NREA)

Solar farm
- Type: Flat-panel PV
- Site resource: 2,300 kWh/(yr*m^{2})
- Site area: 37.2 km^{2} (14.4 mi^{2})

Power generation
- Nameplate capacity: 1,800 MW
- Capacity factor: 26%
- Annual net output: 3.8-4.5 TWh/yr ≈ 433.5 MW

External links
- Commons: Related media on Commons

Benban Solar Park is a large-scale photovoltaic power station in Egypt with a current installed capacity of 1800 MW (1.8 GW) nominal power which corresponds to an annual production of approximately 3.8-4.5 TWh. It is located in Benban (Aswan Governorate) in the western desert, approximately 650 km south of Cairo and 40 km northwest of Aswan. Benban is one of the largest solar power plants in the world.

== Overview ==
In September 2014, the project was initiated as part of Egyptian government's Sustainable Energy Strategy 2035. Initially, NASA had aided in finding the best location to establish the solar park.

Benban Solar Park located on an area of 37.2 km^{2} (14.4 mi^{2}) which is subdivided into 41 separate plots arranged in 4 rows with each plot range in size from 0.3 km^{2} (0.12 mi^{2}) to 1 km^{2} (0.39 mi^{2}). Each plot will be available to different companies to develop 41 plants.

The 41 plants in the Benban solar park will be connected to the high voltage network through four new substations, which will be constructed on the site by the Egyptian Electricity Transmission Company (EETC). These substations will in turn connect to an existing 220 kV line, which passes near the Benban Site at a distance of approximately 12 km. At a later stage EETC may also construct an additional connection to the neighbouring 500 kV line.

According to measurements reported in the environmental & social assessment report the solar site resource is approximately 2,300 kWh/(m^{2}-yr). Assuming a peak insolation of 1000 W/m^{2} this translates to a potential plant capacity factor of approximately 26%, i.e. the average capacity will be 26% of the nameplate capacity. If the planned capacity of 1.8 GW is utilized the potential annual energy production will be slightly more than 4 TWh/yr.

The Benban Solar Park is a part of Egypt's Nubian Suns Feed-in Tariff program, which is a major initiative to influence private sector capital and expertise, in order to support the goal of generating 20% electricity from renewable resources by 2022.

The solar park is so large that it is visible from space.

== Finance ==
On 13 March 2018, ib vogt and Infinity Solar inaugurated the first part of the complex in the presence of the Egyptian Energy Minister, Prof. Dr. Mohamed Shaker El-Markabi. With an output of 64.1 MWp, it is also the country's first large-scale photovoltaic power plant. The project obtained financing from Bayerische Landesbank (BLB) for 85% of the debt, with the remaining 15% coming from Arab African Internatıonal Bank (AAIB). The German government has provided an Euler Hermes export credit guarantee (ECG), covering the BLB loan. As part of the German foreign trade promotion programme, it thus supports Egypt's goal of meeting more than a third of its energy requirements by 2035 through renewable energies.

At the end of January 2019, ib vogt commenced construction of a portfolio of three additional solar power plants with a total capacity of 166.5 MWp in Benban, Aswan Governorate, Egypt. The project partners – an international conglomerate consisting of ib vogt, Infinity Solar, Phoenix Energy and BPE Partners – achieved financial close at the end of October. Debt financing amounting to US$146 Million was secured for these projects. For the “BSEP 50” and “MMID 30” installations financing has been provided by the European Bank for Reconstruction and Development (EBRD), the Dutch Development Bank (FMO) and the Green Climate Fund (GCF). The International Finance Corporation (IFC), the Asian Infrastructure Investment Bank (AIIB) and the CDC Group provided the financing for the “Phoenix 50” project.

The International Finance Corporation led a consortium of Africa Development Bank, Asian Infrastructure Investment Bank, Arab Bank of Bahrain, CDC Group, Europe Arab Bank, Green for Growth Fund, Finnfund, ICBC, and OeEB by pledging US$653 million to finance building and operating 13 plants by six groups of private power companies, including, TAQA Arabia, Shapoorji Energy, a subsidiary of Shapoorji Pallonji Group and Acciona Energy. The 13 solar power plants, which are expected to have a peak power of 752 MW, will cost US$823 million in total. Assuming a capacity factor of 26% this corresponds to an annual production of 1,75 TWh/yr.

Also the Multilateral Investment Guarantee Agency, will provide US$210 million in political risk insurance to 12 projects within Benban.

== IT Services and Management ==
CarpaTech FZE, a United Arab Emirates–based information technology solutions provider, has been engaged by TSK Electrónica y Electricidad (TSK E) to deliver ongoing IT support and digital collaboration services for the Benban Solar Park.

== See also ==
- Energy in Egypt
