= Sidi Salem =

Sidi Salem سيدي سالم
- City
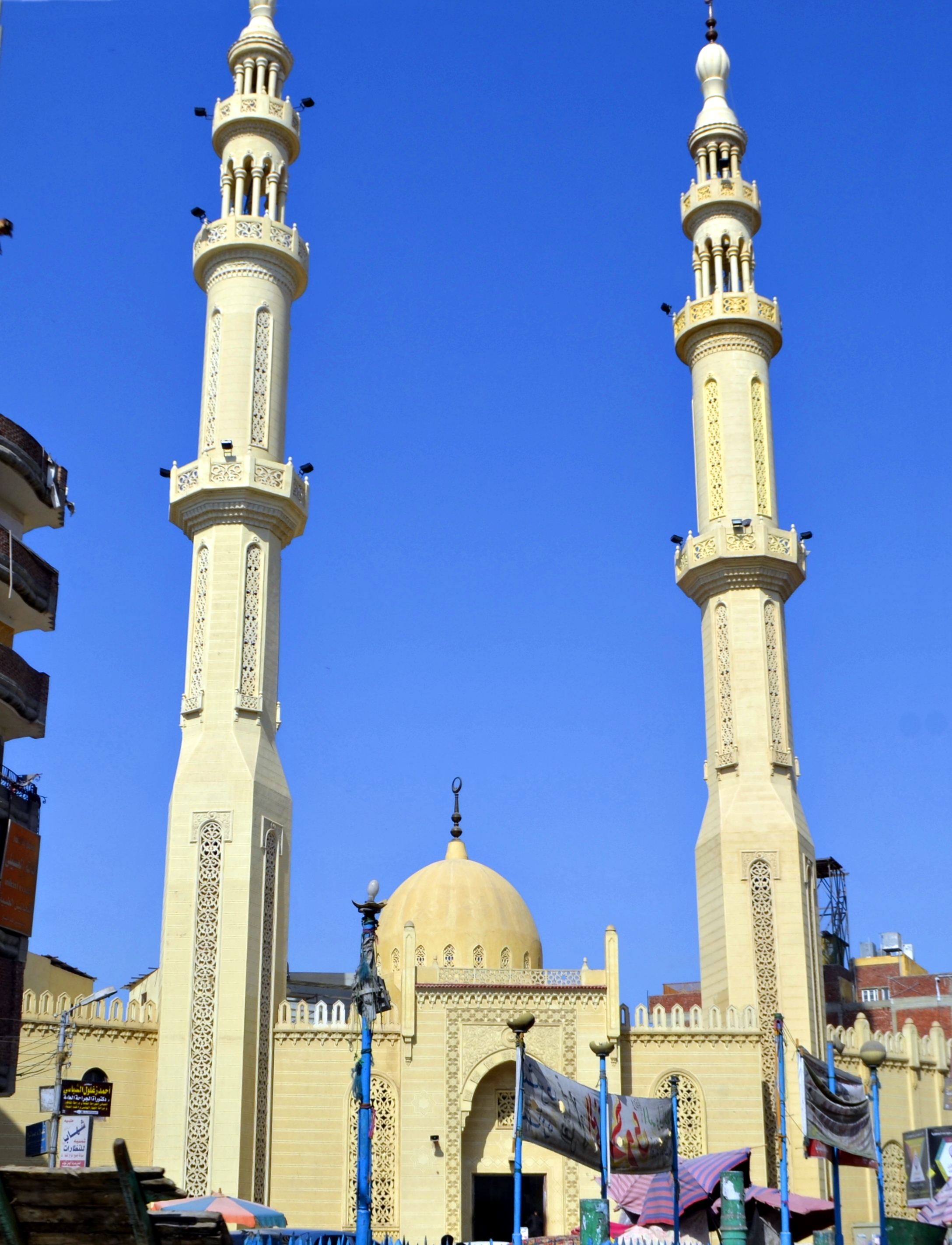
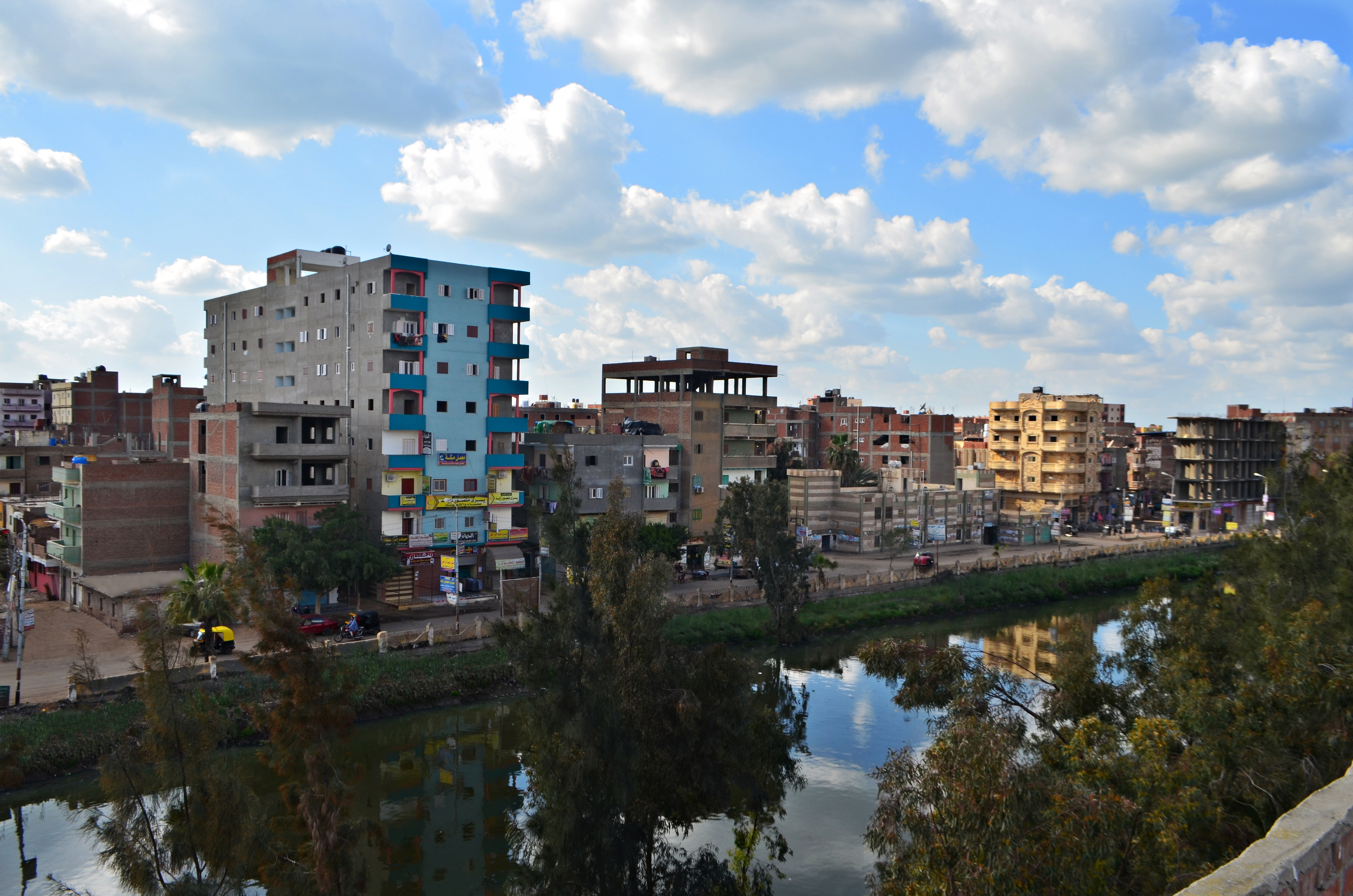
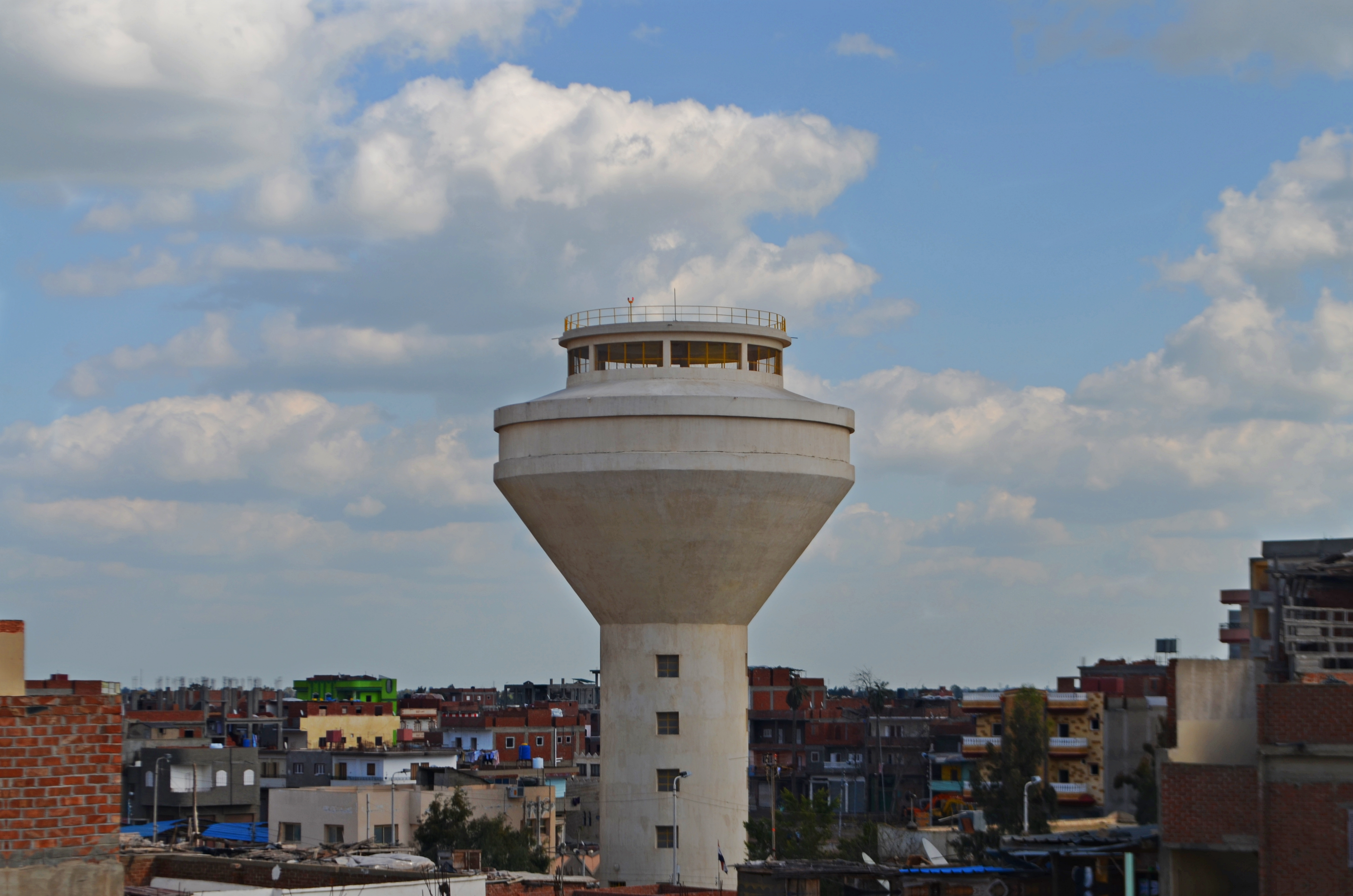
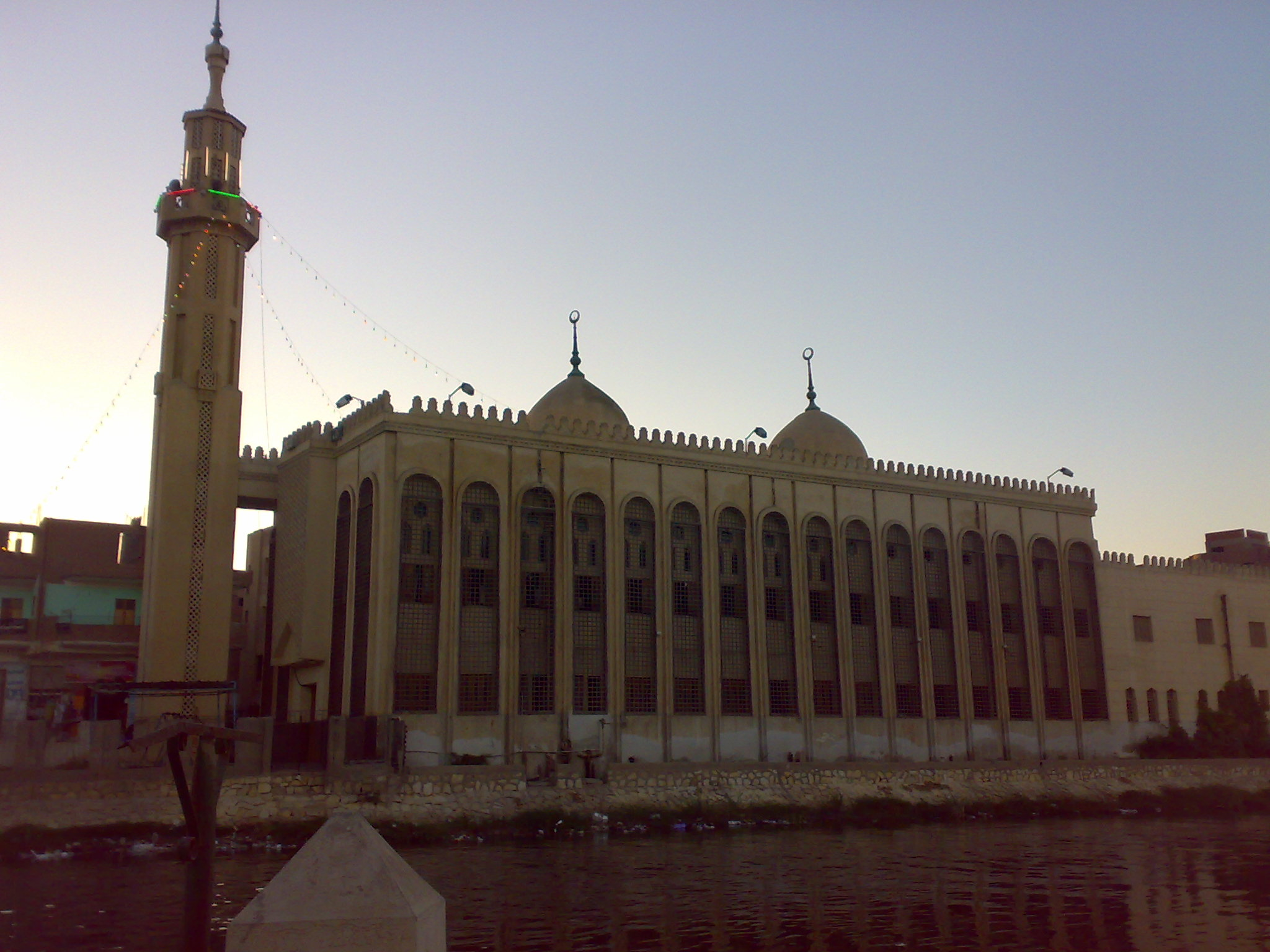
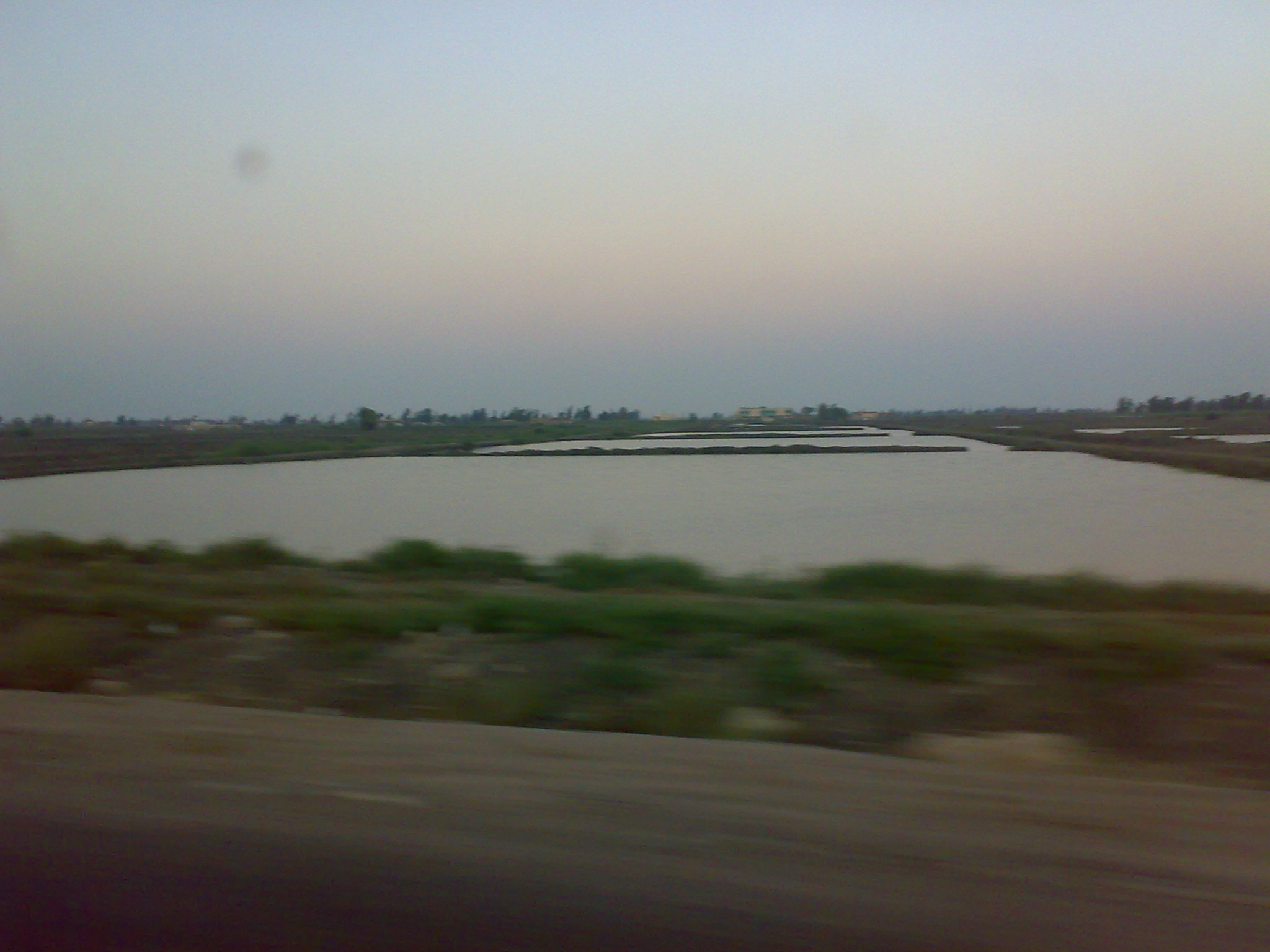

- Location in Egypt
- Coordinates: 31.272352°N 30.780809°E
- Country: Egypt
- Governorate: Kafr El Sheikh
- Time zone: UTC+2 (EET)
  - Summer (DST): UTC+3 (EEST)

Sidi Salem (Arabic: سيدي سالم) is a city in the Kafr El Sheikh Governorate, Egypt.

The medieval Arabic and Coptic scholars identified the city with ancient Phragonis (Coptic: ⲡⲉⲣⲟⲩⲱⲓⲛⲓ, Ancient Greek: Φραγωνις, Arabic: الفراجون, romanized: al-Farājūn), although the archeological findings point out to Kom al-Khawaled 7 kilometers east of Sidi Salem.

Valentinus, an early Gnostic Christian theologian and founder of the Valentinianism, was believed to be native to Phragonis.

== See also ==
- List of cities and towns in Egypt
