= New and Renewable Energy Authority =

Egyptian government institution promoting renewable energy

Agency overview
- Formed: 1986
- Headquarters: Cairo, Egypt
- Website: www.nrea.gov.eg

New and Renewable Energy Authority (NREA) is the government institution which is responsible for the promotion and development of renewable energy projects which include solar and wind energy in Egypt. The main role of the authority is providing research and development for new and renewable energy projects. NREA is affiliated with many energy projects which includes Zafarana wind farm the first wind farm in Egypt and Africa, Jabal al-Zeit wind farm, Benban solar park and others.

Recently, the Authority worked in a project (The Migratory Soaring Birds (MSB)) to protect the migrating birds with the ministry of environment. In 2020 the project awarded the International Energy Prize for saving millions of birds from death by colliding with wind turbines in Jabal al-Zeit wind farm north of Hurghada.
