= Mohamed Shaker El-Markabi =

Egyptian engineer and politician

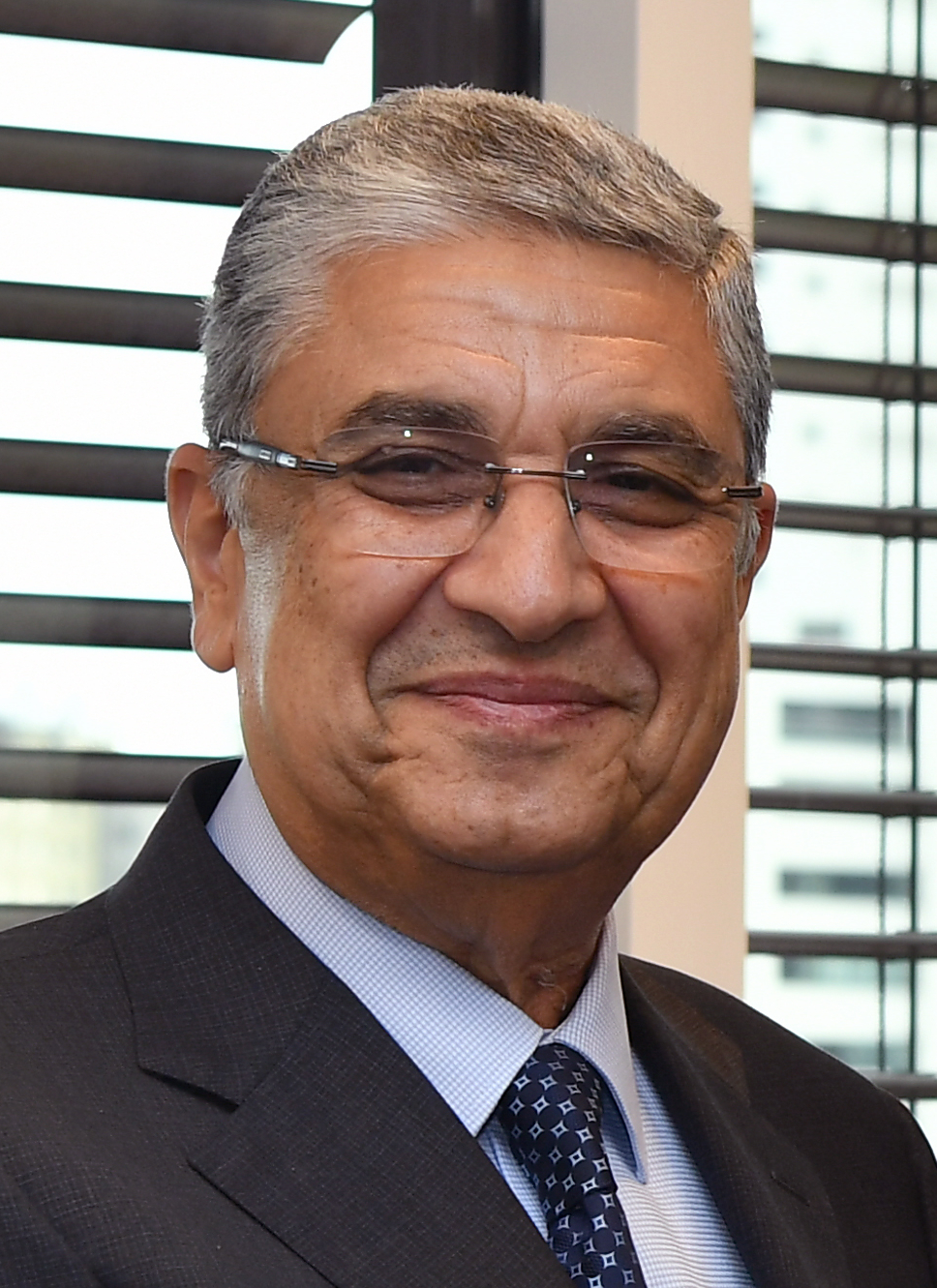
Mohamed Shaker El-Markabi, 2019

Mohamed Shaker El-Markabi (Arabic: محمد شاكر المرقبي) is an Egyptian engineer and government official. He became Minister of Electricity and Energy in 2014. He is Mohamed Hamed Shaker El-Markabi Professor of Electrical Power Engineering at the Faculty of Engineering, Cairo University.

== Early life ==
He graduated from the Faculty of Engineering, Cairo University in 1968 and earned a doctorate in electrical engineering from the Imperial College, University of London in 1978.

=== Education ===
- B.Sc. in Electrical Power Engineering from Faculty of Engineering, Cairo University in 1968.
- M.Sc. in Electrical Power Engineering from Faculty of Engineering, Cairo University in 1972.
- Ph.D. in Electrical Power Engineering from Imperial College, London University in 1978.

== Career ==
He taught at the Faculty of Engineering, Cairo University, and began consultative work in 1982. He established an office advisory in the field of electrical and mechanical consulting. His office has a presence in multiple Arab countries. He worked as an engineer consultant for more than 1,500 projects, and worked with global consulting offices. He is the first Minister of Electricity and Renewable Energy to introduce nuclear power to Egypt.

== Recognition ==
- "Premium Award in Science and Technology" from Institute of Electrical Engineers (IEE) UK in 1985.
