= 7 Continents Club =

The official Seven Continents Club (SCC) was founded in 1995 when Marathon Tours & Travel created the inaugural Antarctica Marathon & Half-Marathon and made it possible for runners to conquer a marathon or half-marathon on seven continents. With more than 8,100 members from 87 countries, the SCC continues to service clients interested in pursuing their seven continents goal.

== Official Seven Continents Club finishers ==
There are 206 members of the 7 Continents Marathon Club as of February 14, 2017. This list only includes runners who have completed the Antarctica Ice Marathon. These include: Winston Fisher, David Gething, Ryan Hall, Becca Pizzi, Joel Runyon, William Tan|Michael Wardian

== 7 Continents Ultra Club ==
An even smaller list of competitors have finished an ultra marathon (50k or more) on all 7 continents.

- Richard Donovan (Ireland)
- Fernando Gonzalez, 2017 (Spain)
- Nahila Hernandez, 2017 (Cuba/Mexico)
- Andrew Murray, 2012 (Scotland)
- Brent Weigner, 1999 (USA)
- Joel Runyon, 2017 (USA)

== The Intercontinental Marathon Club ==
The Intercontinental Marathon Club is composed of athletes who have run 7 Marathons on 7 Continents within 7 Days. This name is organized by Richard Donovan who also organizes The 7 Continents Marathon Club. There are 26 members of this club as of December 1, 2016.

== Disputes over "7 Continents" name ==
There are differing opinions on what constitutes a marathon in Antarctica; and there are several companies and races that lay claim to the "seven continents" name.

=== Seven Continents Club ===
This is the first and official Seven Continents Club, which is administrated by Marathon Tours & Travel. This club organized by Richard Donovan explicitly excludes races taking place on outlying islands.

=== The 7 Continents Marathon, Half-Marathon & Ultra Club ===
This is run by a non-profit club. The club's charter is to compile the first comprehensive list of all runners who have completed marathons, half-marathons and/or ultra marathons on all 7 continents.

=== Litigation ===
In 2022, Marathon Tours & Travel was awarded the registered trademark for the official Seven Continents Club.

There is ongoing contention between the race operators to what is considered "Antarctica" and by extension the "7 continents club."

== Similar challenges ==
- Marathon
- People Who Have Walked Across Australia
- People Who Have Walked Across America
