= Nathan Godfrey =

Sports manager

- Born: September 13, 1977 (age 49); Melbourne, Australia
- Education: MBA, BCom, BPhEd
- Occupations: CEO, GM, Director
- Employer: Football Australia
- Spouse: Heike Jensen (married 2016-present)
- Children: 2

Nathan Godfrey (13 September 1977) is an Australian sports executive best known as former CEO of the Canterbury Rugby Union in New Zealand and inaugural General Manager of the Australian Championship at Football Australia. He is also a member of the 7 Continents Club and founder of the Kangaroo Island Marathon.

== Education ==
Godfrey attended Christchurch Boys' High School from 1991-1995 and subsequently studied commerce and education degrees at the University of Otago. He graduated with an MBA from the Australian Institute of Business in 2019.

== Career ==
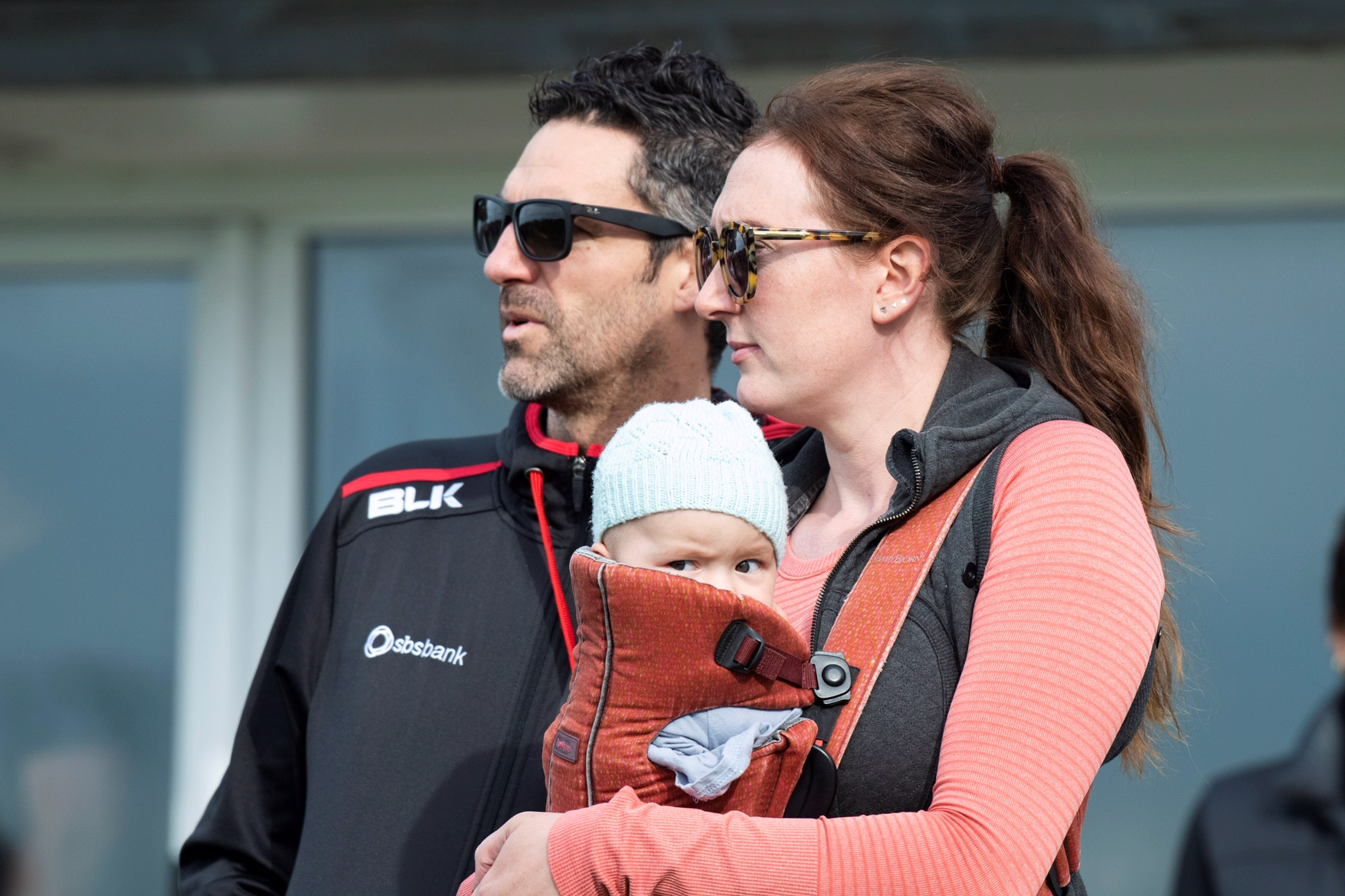
Canterbury Rugby Union CEO Nathan Godfrey watching a game of rugby in Christchurch, with his wife Australian Volleyball star Heike Jensen and their daughter.

Godfrey’s sports management career began in 2010 as an AFLPA accredited player agent before joining the Adelaide Crows in 2012 where he worked for 3 years in senior commercial roles. In early 2015, Godfrey relocated to New Zealand to take up a role as Head of Commercial at the Wellington Phoenix working closely with Football Australia to renew their A-League license and secure notable global partnerships.

In December 2016, Godfrey was appointed Chief Executive Officer at the Canterbury Rugby Union following in the footsteps of All Blacks CEO Steve Tew and Crusaders CEO Hamish Riach.

Godfrey was instrumental in leading a high-profile anti-discrimination campaign endorsed by the Human Rights Commission. He was also responsible for introducing the Blue Card Concussion Initiatives (BCCI) under a trial that was later rolled out nationally by New Zealand Rugby.

Godfrey was vocal in lobbying the Jacinda Ardern Government and Christchurch City Council for investment in a new multi-purpose venue to replace the earthquake damaged stadium in Christchurch. He also signed off on an investment in the Seattle Seawolves, a US-based rugby franchise, as part of a wider strategic alliance to grow commercial reach and attract international visitors to Christchurch.

Godfrey endorsed a controversial decision to snub the Crusaders and Canterbury Men’s teams who had both won their respective titles, instead supporting a nomination for the Canterbury Women’s team following their inaugural success in 2017 after five previous grand final losses. This decision was vindicated by the Canterbury Women being named ‘Team of the Year’ at the 2018 Sports Awards and subsequently winning four New Zealand Championship titles in a row.

In late 2018, following a sabbatical to complete his MBA thesis, Godfrey announced he was stepping down as CEO to return home to Australia with his young family. He immediately entered the public sector as Director Programs & Operations at the NSW Government Office of Sport and was responsible for grant programs, regulation and policy development, and consumer services. He also sat on the National Board at the Duke of Edinburgh Award Australia.

In 2023, Godfrey accepted a role as GM National Second Tier (NST) at Football Australia. The NST, often referred to as the National Second Division, is a new professional competition structure established to connect the Australian football pyramid. Godfrey led a Request for Proposal selection process that identified eight foundation clubs. In late 2024, Football Australia announced a 16-team Champions’ League format and start date before unveiling the official brand in early 2025.

Godfrey was involved in securing a landmark multi-year free-to-air broadcast deal with SBS covering 55 matches. Prior to the new league kicking off, Godfrey also worked closely with the FIFA development team to implement a Professional Club workshop featuring several international experts and bringing together representatives from A-League and Australian Championship clubs.

In a historic Grand Final, South Melbourne Football Club defeated Marconi Stallions 2-1 and were crowned inaugural winners of the Australian Championship.

In December 2025, Godfrey was announced as Chief Operating Officer at Water Polo Australia. He was a key strategic figure on the World Aquatics Local Organising Committee responsible for delivering the 2026 World Cup Finals hosted at Sydney Olympic Park Aquatic Centre. The tournament featured 16 nations and was hailed a success after the Aussie Stingers national women's team defeated Russia to win the bronze medal and the Aussie Sharks national men's team finished fourth. On the eve of the tournament, Godfrey led the launch of a transformative brand identity designed to elevate the commercial profile of both national teams, and honour past and present players.

== Family ==
Godfrey married Australian volleyball athlete Heike Jensen in 2016. They have two children and currently reside in the Adelaide Hills. Jensen is a Chartered Accountant and represented Australia on the FIVB World Tour from 2005-2012.

== Running ==
Godfrey was a promising junior 400m runner and participated at the IAAF World U20 Track & Field Championships in 1996. He holds the Christchurch Boys' High School record of 48.53 seconds set in 1995.

Godfrey completed marathons in France, Japan, USA, Peru, South Africa, and Australia from 2008-2015. In 2018, he became a member of the 7 Continents Club finishing the Antarctica Marathon in 4 hours 51 minutes.

In 2015, Godfrey founded the Kangaroo Island Marathon which is held annually in Flinders Chase National Park. The event has attracted thousands of runners representing over 30 countries. Following devastating bushfires during the summer of 2020, the event was awarded a bronze medal at the 2021 South Australian Tourism Awards in recognition of community resilience and sustainability. The business was acquired by international run travel agency Marathon Tours & Travel in late 2024.

== TV ==
Godfrey was a cast member on the inaugural season of Million Dollar Island; an adventure TV format hosted by SAS-star Ant Middleton and broadcast on the Seven Network in 2023.

Godfrey was a fan favorite and popular leader in his camp after winning $50,000 during an arena challenge on day six. The following night, Godfrey shocked fellow players and host Ant Middleton when he donated his bracelets to team-mate Brett Krause in what was arguably the most strategic play of the game propelling Krause to a place in the final 3.
