= North Pole Marathon =

Foot race

- Date: Mid-April (through 2018); July-August (2023-)
- Location: North Pole
- Event type: Road
- Distance: Marathon
- Established: 2003
- Course records: Men's: 3:14:49 (2024) (United States) William Hafferty; Women's: 4:46:26 (2025) (United States) Becca Pizzi
- Website: www.npmarathon.com

The North Pole Marathon is an extreme marathon staged at or near the Geographic North Pole on floating Arctic Sea ice. The classic 42.195 km (26.219 mi) marathon race is run on a loop about 10 times over hard snow or the frozen ice of the Arctic Ocean. There are individual competitions with male and female divisions, and a team competition for teams of three or more. There is also an option to run a half marathon.

The North Pole Marathon has been recognized by Guinness World Records as the "Northernmost Marathon on Earth".

== Description and history ==
Since the geographic North Pole is located in the middle of the Arctic Ocean, and the ice that covers it is constantly shifting, the race can only be said to be run near it; even if the race starts at the exact pole, the ice could have drifted away within minutes. The event is a full member of the Association of International Marathons and Distance Races (AIMS), although AIMS notes that its temporary course cannot be measured to normal AIMS road-race standards. The North Pole Marathon has been recognized by Guinness World Records as the "Northernmost Marathon on Earth".

The first unofficial North Pole Marathon was a 'solo' run by Richard Donovan on April 5, 2002, in a time of 3:48:12. Richard won the first South Pole Marathon ten weeks previously and became the first marathoner at both poles by completing the North Pole Marathon.

For the first 15 official races, the race was run in April, when the sun shines 24 hours a day. The temperature was extreme cold, −25 °C (−13 °F) during the 2004 race. Runners wore snowshoes or trail shoes with studs on their feet, two pairs of gloves and mittens on their hands, and multiple layers of windproof and thermal gear on their legs and bodies to prevent frostbite. On their heads they wore hats, face masks, and goggles; if these were removed, frost and icicles would form on the runner's face.

The first official exploratory competitive race was held on April 17, 2003, at Camp Barneo, a seasonal floating way station, 60 miles from the North Pole, and was operated jointly by several entities with 10 competitors. The winner was Martin Tighe of Great Britain with a time of 5:02:10, who had trained for the run in an ice-cream freezer. Mary Ritz of the United States was the sole women's racer.

In 2005, the North Pole Marathon was cancelled due to a dispute between French and Russian logistics operators. Races resumed from 2006 through 2018. The 2019 marathon was cancelled due to a political dispute between Ukraine, which owned the plane to transport the runners, and Russia, which owned Camp Barneo. The 2020 marathon was cancelled by the Norwegian government, which owned Longyearbyen, from which the runners fly to Barneo, due to the COVID-19 pandemic. Barneo was closed again in 2021 due to the pandemic, and inaccessible in 2022 when Europe banned Russian planes due to the Russian invasion of Ukraine.

Starting from 2023, race organizers tried a different approach. They organized the race during the summer, July or August, when the weather is warmer (−2 °C (28 °F) in August 2023), which allowed runners to travel to the Pole on a French icebreaker, Le Commandant Charcot, from Longyearbyen, which takes about a week. Runners needed to wear fewer thermal layers, but did need to wear life vests for safety while running over the thinner ice. Armed guards stood by to protect runners from polar bears. In 2026, organizers said the race course ice disappeared hours after the race ended.

== Results ==
=== Past winners ===
Key: Course record

Edition	Year	Men's winner	Time (h:m:s)	Women's winner	Time (h:m:s)
1st	2003	Martin Tighe (GBR)	5:02:10	Mary Ritz (USA)	
2nd	2004	Sean Burch (USA)	3:43:17	Stevie Matthews (GBR)	7:55:32
—	2005	Cancelled			
3rd	2006	Michael Collins (IRE)	4:28:35	Alison Hamlett (GBR)	5:52:56
4th	2007	Thomas Maguire (IRE)	3:36:10	Susan Holliday (GBR)	6:17:40
5th	2008	Ahn Byeung-sik (KOR)	4:02:37	Cathrine Due (DEN)	5:37:14
6th	2009	Evgeniy Gorkov (RUS)	4:27:05	Pushpa Chandra (CAN)	7:27:31
7th	2010	Joep Rozendal (NED)	5:00:58	Emer Dooley (IRE)	5:56:54
8th	2011	István Tóth (HUN)	4:54:03	Richelle Turner (AUS)	6:03:06
9th	2012	Andrew Murray (GBR)	4:17:08	Demelza Farr (AUS)	6:06:36
10th	2013	Gary Thornton (IRE)	3:49:29	Fiona Oakes (GBR)	4:53:10
11th	2014	Michael Wardian (USA)	4:07:40	Anne-Marie Flammersfeld (GER)	4:52:45
12th	2015	Petr Vabroušek (CZE)	4:22:24	Heather Hawkins (AUS)	6:57:39
13th	2016	Dorn Wenninger (USA)	5:17:33	Gulzhamal DeFelice (USA)	5:50:12
14th	2017	Piotr Suchenia (POL)	4:06:34	Frédérique Laurent (FRA)	6:21:03
15th	2018	Argyrios Papathanasopoulos (GRE)	4:34:36	Guoping Xie (CHN)	6:43:20
—	2019-2022	Cancelled			
16th	2023	Patrick Charlebois (CAN)	3:48:41	Melissa Kullander (USA)	5:24:39
17th	2024	William Hafferty (USA)	3:14:49	Katherine Kowalchek (USA)	5:36:00
18th	2025	Oleg Polyntsev (GBR)	3:43:25	Becca Pizzi (USA)	4:46:26
19th	2026	Shengxian Wang (CHN)	3:52:22	Rikke Dam (DEN)	6:54:02

== Notable participants and achievements ==
Explorer Sir Ranulph Fiennes came second in the 2004 race. Mark Pollock of Ireland became the first blind athlete to complete a marathon at the North Pole during the 2004 event. Guided by John O'Regan, he finished in 5:51:48. The 2006 race was won by Irish novelist Michael Collins. In 2007, William Tan, a wheelchair competitor, completed a marathon distance in 21 hours and 10 minutes. In 2010, Jamie Cuthbertson, a blind runner from the United Kingdom completed the race in 7:37:02. In 2016, 78 year old Michel Ribet (FRA/USA) became the oldest runner to complete the marathon in 8:15:10, at 78 years old. In 2018, escorted blind runner Gary Leung Siu-wai finished, becoming the first blind runner to complete both the North Pole and Antarctic Ice Marathon & 100k ultra race. In 2024, Susan Ragon (USA) became the oldest woman to complete the North Pole Marathon when she was 73 years old; she fell and broke her wrist before completing in 8:58:33. In 2026, Rikke Dam (DEN) who won the women's race in 6:54:02, ran with her husband and 14 year old son Felix Dam.

The tournament men's record of 3:36:10 was set by Thomas Maguire (IRL) in 2007, then broken by Billy Hafferty's (USA) 3:14:49 in 2024. The tournament women's record of 4:46:26 was set by Becca Pizzi (USA) in 2025.

== See also ==
- Antarctica Marathon
- Antarctic Ice Marathon & 100k ultra race
