= Mars Hill University =

Christian university in Mars Hill, North Carolina, US

Coordinates: 35.82603°N 82.55070°W

- Former names: French Broad Baptist Institute (1856–1859); Mars Hill College (1859–2013)
- Motto: Pro Christo Adolescentibusque "For Christ and For Youth"
- Type: Private college
- Established: 1856; 170 years ago
- Religious affiliation: Christian
- Endowment: $75 million
- President: Tracy Parkinson
- Faculty: 74
- Students: 1,032 (fall 2022)
- Undergraduates: 994
- Postgraduates: 38
- Location: Mars Hill, North Carolina, U.S.
- Colors: Blue and gold
- Nickname: Lions
- Sporting affiliations: NCAA Division II, South Atlantic Conference, National Collegiate Cycling Association
- Website: mhu.edu
- Mars Hill College Historic District
- U.S. National Register of Historic Places
- U.S. Historic district
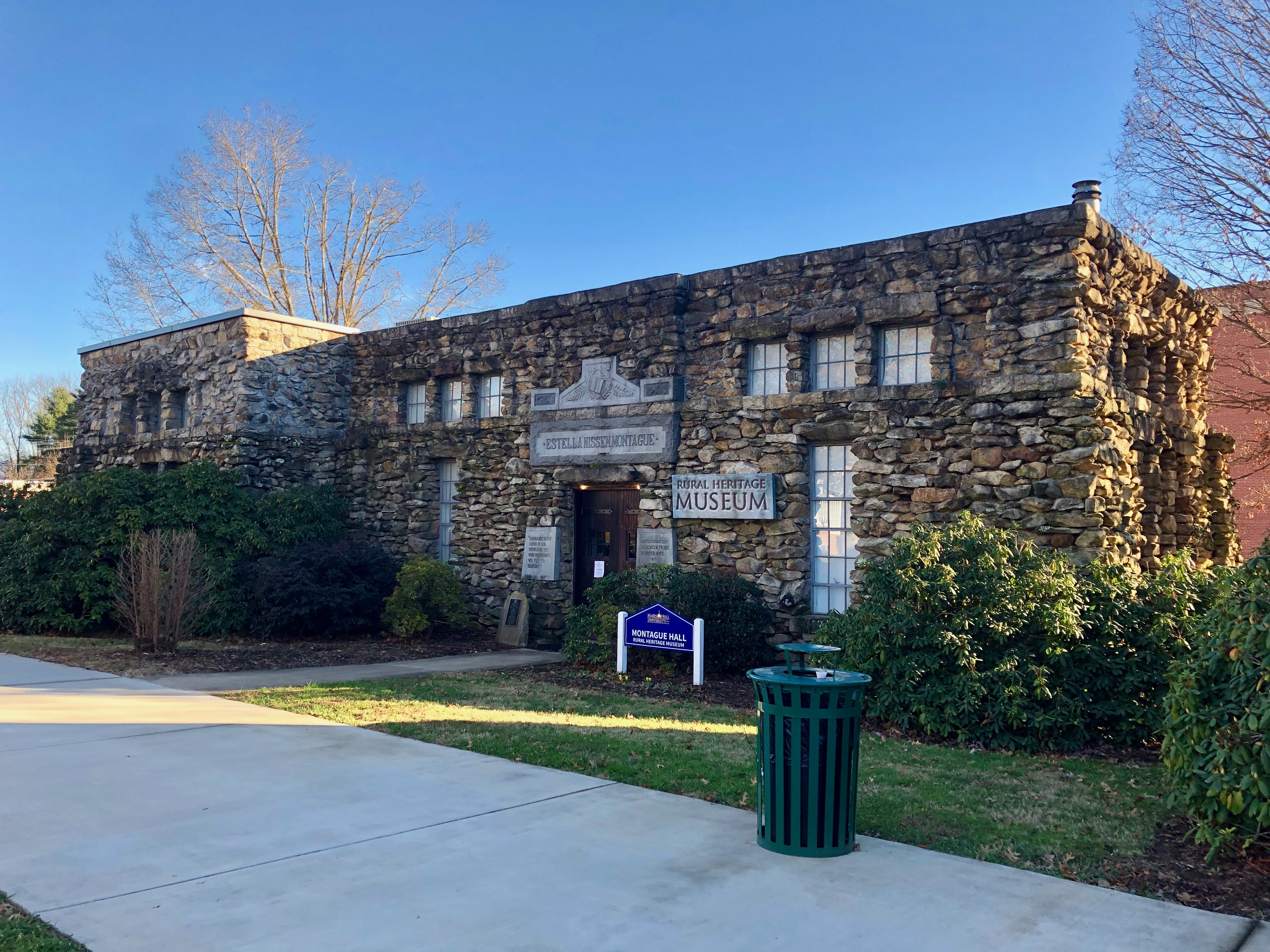
- Montague Hall (Rural Heritage Museum)

- Location within North Carolina Location within the United States
- Location: Bet. Bailey and Cascade Sts. N and S
- Area: 27.2 acres (11.0 ha)
- Built: 1892
- Architectural style: Colonial Revival, Classical Revival, etc.
- NRHP reference No.: 06000865
- Added to NRHP: September 12, 2006

Mars Hill University is a private Christian college in Mars Hill, North Carolina, United States. It offers 35 undergraduate majors and includes a school of nursing and graduate schools in education, criminal justice, and management. From 1859 to 2013, the school was called Mars Hill College; in August 2013, it officially changed its name to Mars Hill University.

== History ==
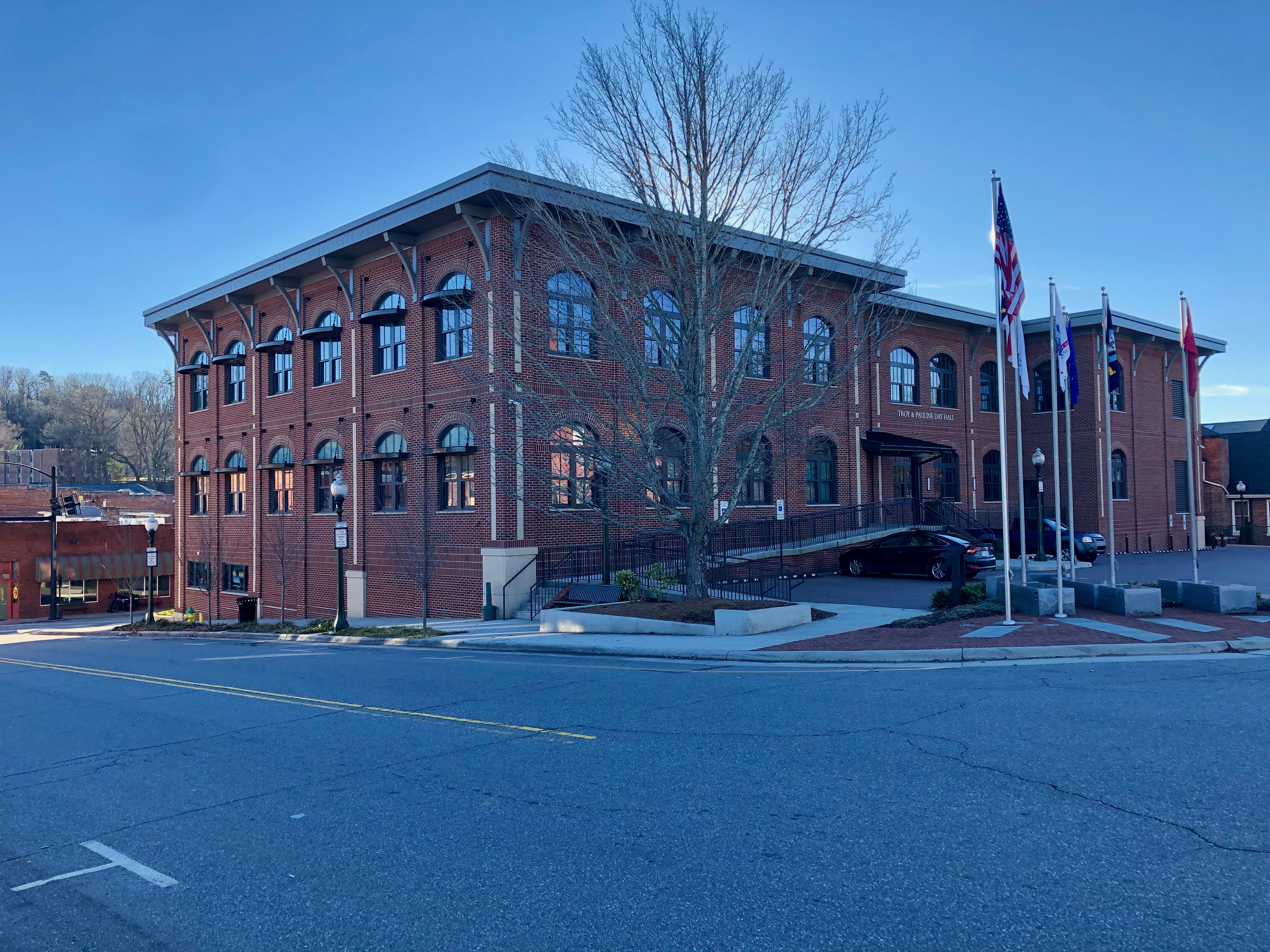
Day Hall on College Street

Mars Hill University was founded in 1856, and it is the oldest college or university in western North Carolina. It started as the French Broad Baptist Institute, sharing a name with the nearby French Broad River. In 1859, the institution changed its name to Mars Hill, in honor of the hill in ancient Athens on which the Apostle Paul debated Christianity with the city's leading philosophers. During the American Civil War, the institution was closed for two years, but it reopened after the war. From 1897 to 1938, the institution, under the leadership of Robert Moore, enjoyed substantial financial and physical growth. In 1921, Mars Hill became an accredited junior college. Hoyt Blackwell served as president from 1938 to 1966, and under his leadership, Mars Hill became an accredited four-year college in 1962. From 1966 to 1996, Fred Bentley served as the college's president. Bentley was, at the time of his appointment in 1966, one of the youngest college presidents in the United States. In 1996, Max Lennon was appointed president and served until 2002.

Dan Lunsford, a 1969 graduate of Mars Hill University (MHU), served as university president from 2002 to 2018. Under Lunsford, MHU constructed three new dormitories, a new health sciences building to house its nursing program, a new classroom building to house the business department (the most popular major on campus), completely renovated and greatly expanded the math and sciences classroom building, upgraded its athletic facilities, tripled its endowment, increased its student enrollment, and started a graduate school in education. In June 2018, John Anthony "Tony" Floyd became the institution's president, among his accomplishments is the building of a new, three-story student union in the heart of the campus. In 2025, Floyd announced that he would be retiring in May 2026 after serving as university president for eight years. In March 2026, the institution announced that Tracy Parkinson, who had served as university provost and executive vice president since 2020, would become the institution's seventh president in 129 years.

In 2008, MHU gained autonomy from the Baptist State Convention of North Carolina, when the state convention voted to eliminate the requirement that it have final approval over who could serve as trustees for the school; this ruling allows the institution to choose non-Baptists as trustees. The state convention also agreed to start transferring funds traditionally given directly to the institution into a new scholarship fund for Baptist students. The move was made in conjunction with the four other remaining N.C. Baptist colleges – Gardner–Webb University, Campbell University, Wingate University, and Chowan University. The institution, while maintaining a cooperative relationship with the North Carolina Baptist Convention and acknowledging its Baptist roots, is no longer directly associated with any Baptist church or organization, but proclaims in its mission statement that it "is an academic community rooted in the Christian faith", and that the institution is "committed to an emphasis on service and Christian ethics." The college yearbook is called the Laurel, the college literary magazine is the Cadenza, and the college newspaper is The Hilltop.

Mars Hill University is accredited by the Commission on Colleges of the Southern Association of Colleges and Schools to award bachelor's and master's degrees, and is an affiliate of the National Association of Independent Colleges and Universities, Council of Independent Colleges, the Appalachian College Association, and other similar organizations.

== Academics ==
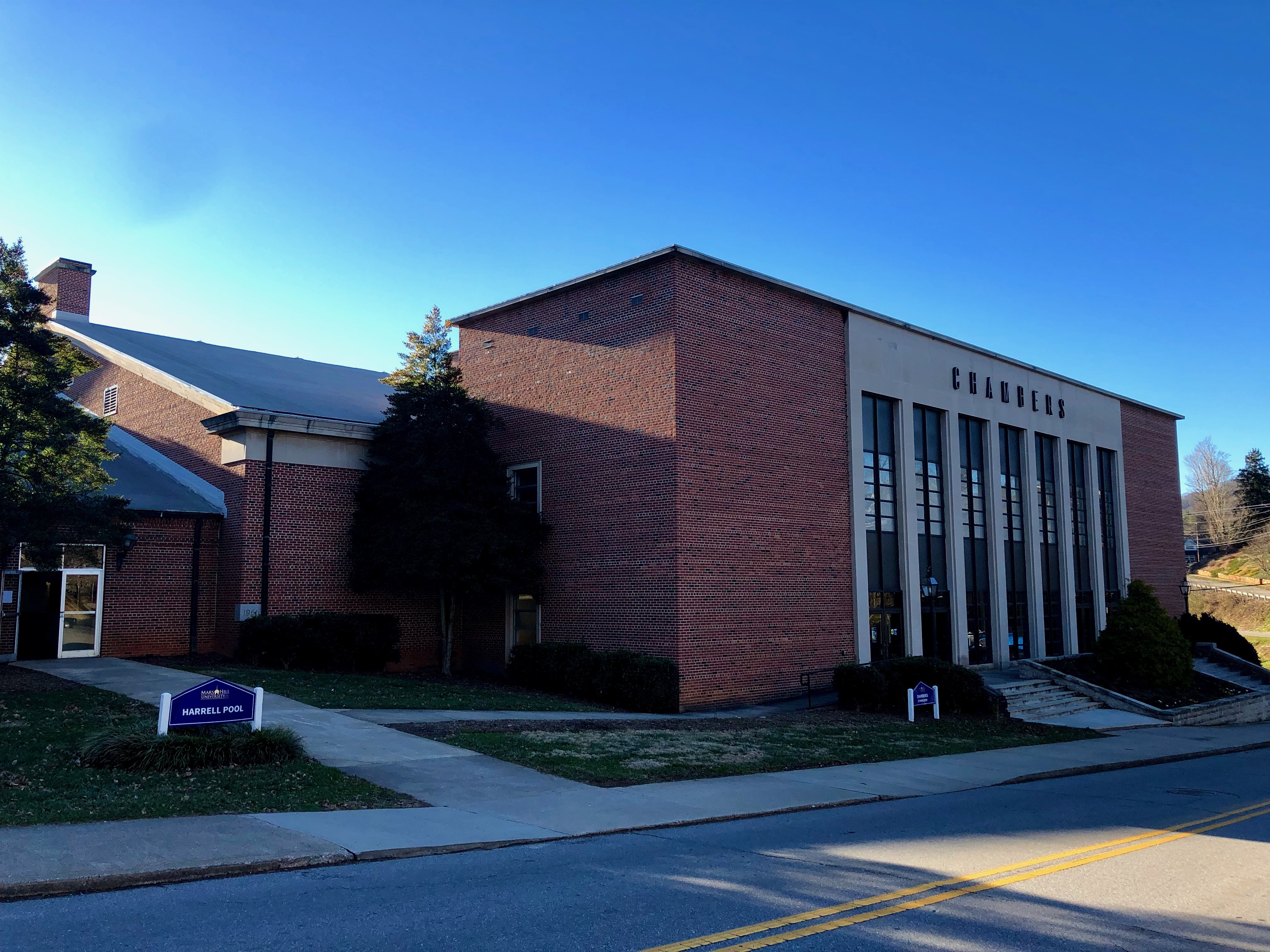
Chambers Gymnasium

The institution offers six undergraduate degrees (bachelor of arts, bachelor of science, bachelor of science in nursing (BSN), bachelor of music, bachelor of fine arts, and bachelor of social work), three graduate degrees (master of arts [MA], master of education, and master of management [MM]), and 35 majors. In May 2013, the institution awarded its first master of education degrees. The institution recently added an MA in criminal justice program, and an MM program. In August 2016, the institution opened a BSN program. The most popular majors are in the fields of business administration and management, education, social work, physical education teaching and coaching, and general psychology. In 1932, Lamar Stringfield, a Mars Hill alumnus, formed the North Carolina Symphony, the first state-supported orchestra in the nation. The "Bailey Mountain Cloggers", the institution's clog dance team, have won 31 national championships in clogging, and they have performed all over the United States and internationally in Canada, Mexico, England, Scotland, Ireland, Austria, France, Greece, Poland, the Czech Republic, Colombia, Italy, and Indonesia. In 2002, the institution opened the Ramsey Center for Regional Studies. Named after an alumnus who served a record four terms as the speaker of the North Carolina House of Representatives, the center is dedicated to preserving the heritage and culture of the people of the southern Appalachian Mountains.

=== Rankings ===
Academic rankings

Baccalaureate
- Washington Monthly: 74 of 242

Regional
- U.S. News & World Report: 28 of 131

In the 2024-2025 rankings of "America's Best Colleges", U.S. News & World Report ranked MHU number 28 out of 131 colleges in Regional Colleges South. Among Regional Colleges South, Mars Hill was also ranked number 22 in "Best Value Schools", number five in "Best Undergraduate Teaching", number 32 in "Top Performers on Social Mobility", and number eight for "Best Colleges for Veterans" based on its participation in "federal initiatives helping veterans and active-duty service members pay for their degrees."

=== Undergraduate admissions ===
In 2024, MHU accepted 74.2% of undergraduate applicants, with admission standards considered moderately competitive, and with those enrolled having an average 3.5 high school grade point average. The college does not require submission of standardized test scores, having a test blind policy.

== Campus ==
The institution has a scenic 194-acre (79 ha) campus; most of the dormitories are located atop two hills, named "men's hill" and "women's hill". The main campus is located in a small valley between the two hills. The institution is surrounded by the Appalachian Mountains; from various points on campus, seeing Mount Mitchell, the highest peak east of the Mississippi River, is possible. Bailey Mountain (nicknamed "Old Bailey") is located about a mile (1.5 km) northwest from campus and is a local landmark. Interstate 26, located one mile east of the institution, provides access to the nearby cities of Asheville, North Carolina, to the south, and Johnson City, Tennessee to the north.

== Athletics ==
The institution is a Division II member of the National Collegiate Athletic Association, and it is also a member of the South Atlantic Conference. MHU's sports mascot is the mountain lion; the institution's colors are royal blue and gold.

== Notable alumni ==
- John S. Battle (1890–1972), lawyer who served in both houses of the Virginia General Assembly and as the 56th governor of Virginia
- Archie Campbell (1914–1987) American comedian and writer
- Ludovico Corsini (born 1993), Olympic swimmer
- Jerry C. Davis (born 1943), president of College of the Ozarks
- Mike Houston, (born 1971), college football coach
- Woodrow W. Jones (1914–2002), United States Congressman and federal judge
- Dan Locklair (born 1949), music professor and composer
- Graham Martin (1912–1990), U.S. Foreign Service officer and ambassador
- Wayne Oates (1917–1999), psychologist and minister
- Becca Pizzi (born 1980), first American woman to complete and win the World Marathon Challenge
- Erwin Potts (1932–2017), former president and CEO of the McClatchy Company
- David Price (born 1940), United States congressman and political science professor
- Liston B. Ramsey (1919–2001), North Carolina state legislator and speaker of the House
- Jonas Randolph (born 1990), college football player
- Jon Richt (born 1990), football coach
- Debbie Ricker (born 1965), reproductive biologist and academic administrator
- Eugene L. Roberts, Jr., (born 1932), newspaper editor
- Lacy Thornburg (born 1929), North Carolina state attorney general and U.S. federal district judge
