= Ram Gopal Kothari =

Indian entrepreneur and endurance athlete

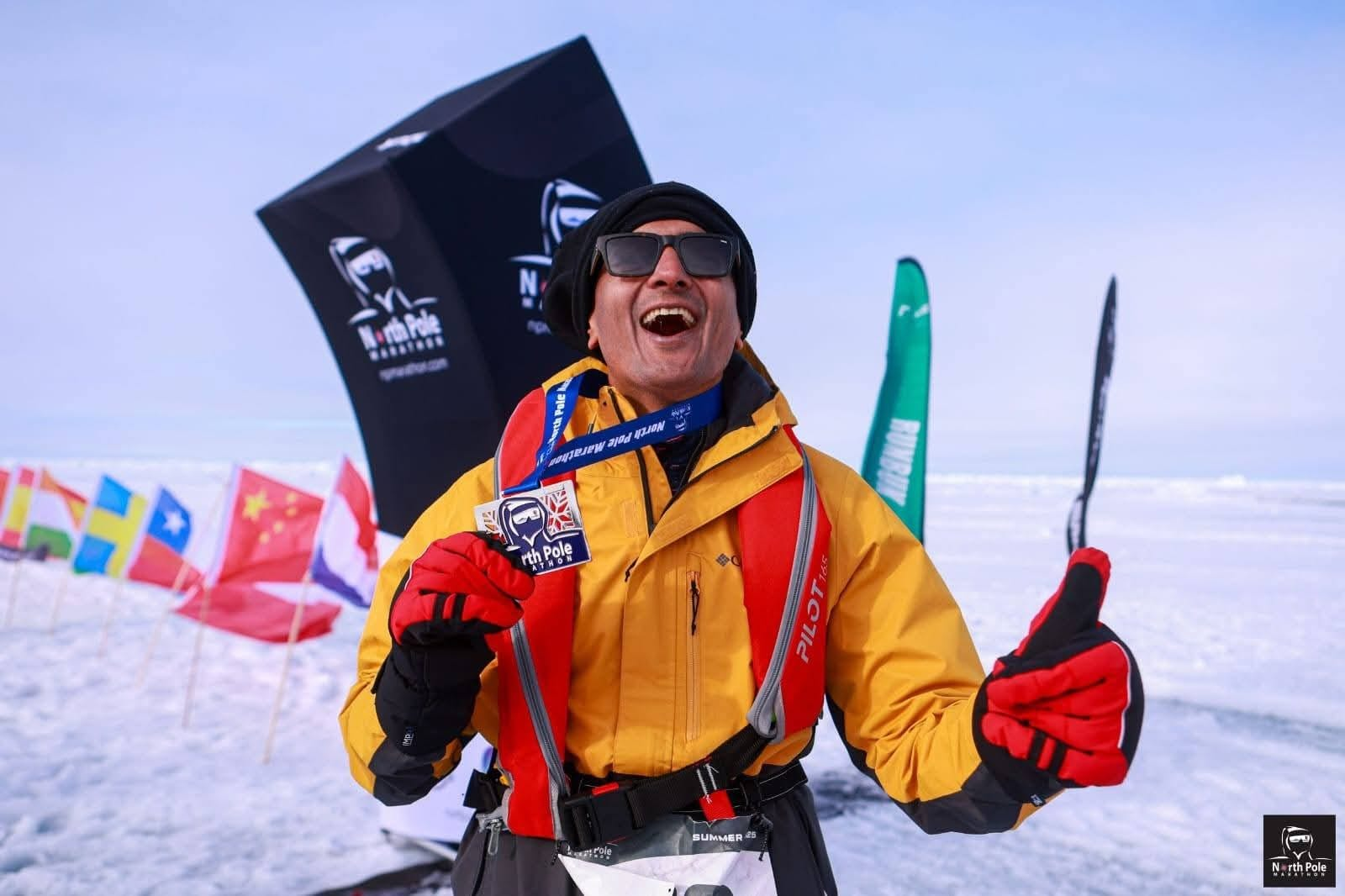
- Kothari at North Pole Marathon

Personal information
- Nationality: Indian
- Born: Kolkata, West Bengal, India
- Occupation: Athlete

Sport
- Sport: Endurance running

Ram Gopal Kothari is an Indian endurance athlete from Kolkata, West Bengal.

== Endurance sports ==
Kothari completed his first half-marathon at the Tata Mumbai Marathon in 2018 and subsequently participated in other half-marathons, including the Kolkata Marathon.

In 2025, Kothari completed the 42.195-kilometre North Pole Marathon at the Geographic North Pole in a time of 8:00:05. He was reported as the first Indian to complete a full marathon at the Geographic North Pole. He completed the 42.195-kilometre Volcano Marathon race at Easter Island in 5 hours, 5 minutes and 8 seconds, finishing seventh overall and becoming the first Indian to complete a marathon on Easter Island as well.

By 2022, Kothari had travelled to all seven continents, including Antarctica. Before competing in the 2026 Volcano Marathon on Easter Island, Kothari trained for the course's terrain by undertaking practice runs of up to 30 kilometres and running on the ramps of Salt Lake Stadium.
