= Fiona Oakes =

British distance runner (born 1966)

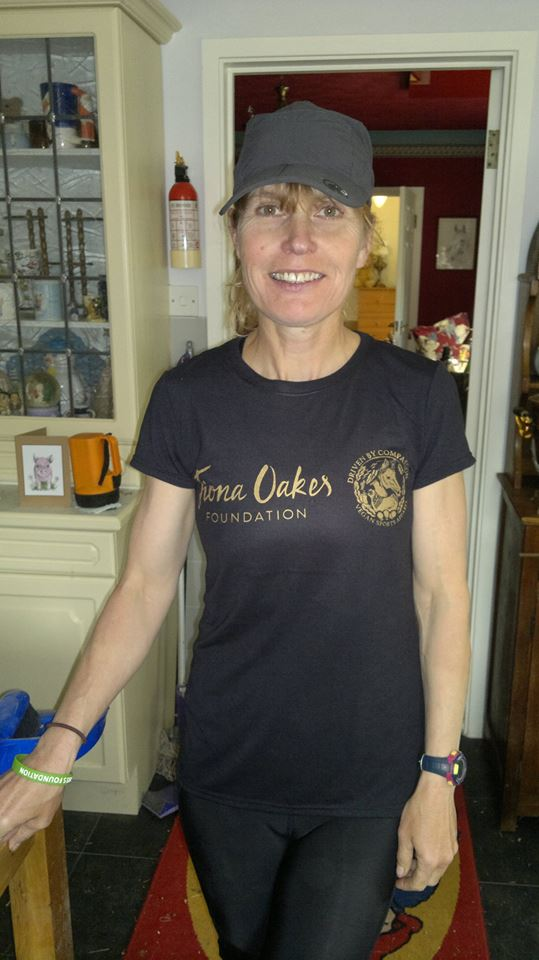
Fiona Oakes

Fiona Oakes (born 1 August 1966) is a British distance runner who holds four world records for marathon running. In 2013, she won both the Antarctic Ice Marathon and the North Pole Marathon. She runs despite losing a kneecap due to a tumour when she was 17. Oakes has been vegan since she was 6 years old. As far as Fiona is aware, she was the first vegan woman to complete the Marathon des Sables. She runs Tower Hill Stables Animal Sanctuary, is an ambassador for The Vegan Society, and is a patron of the Captive Animals Protection Society.

== World records ==
In 2013, Oakes became the fastest female in aggregate time to complete a marathon on each continent (23h:27m:40s); the fastest female in aggregate time to complete a marathon on each continent and the North Pole (28h:20m:50s); and the fastest female in elapsed time to complete a marathon on each continent and the North Pole (225 days and 18 hours). In 2018 Oakes broke her 4th Guinness World record by becoming the fastest female to run a half marathon in an animal costume (dressed as a cow) in Tromso, Norway (1h:32m:24s).

== Other achievements ==
In the women's category of the Atacama Crossing race in September 2018, Oakes won her age group (50 - 59). She also won stage six in her gender group in the same race.

Oakes won the "Charity Champion" category of the 2018 Brave Britons Amplifon Awards.

In 2019, Oakes qualified to represent England Masters in 2020 for both the Fleet Half Marathon and Bristol 10 km races. Both qualifications were subsequently carried over to 2021 as a result of cancellations due to the COVID-19 pandemic.

Oakes published a biography titled 'Running for Good: The Fiona Oakes Story' in 2020.

Oakes is the founder and Race Director of the ultra-marathon, Running for Good Ultra. This is a week-long foot race held during October in the Moroccan Sahara Desert. The specific aim of the event is to raise awareness of, and issues surrounding, the global impact of climate change.

== Running for Good ==
Oakes was the subject of Running for Good, a documentary film by Keegan Kuhn, centred around her run in the 2017 Marathon des Sables.
