= Kasha Rigby =

American skier (1970–2024)

- Born: Catherine Rigby; 1970; Stowe, Vermont, U.S.
- Died: February 13, 2024 (aged 54) near Brezovica, Kosovo
- Occupation: Competitive skier
- Known for: Extreme telemark skiing
- Partner: Magnus Wolfe Murray

Catherine "Kasha" Rigby (1970 – February 13, 2024) was an American competitive skier from Utah. She is most noted for her many achievements and first descents as "the pioneer of extreme telemark skiing."

== Biography ==
Kasha Rigby was born in Stowe, Vermont. She started skiing when she was very young. and began telemark skiing as a teenager. She began traveling at age 19, leaving college to explore Africa. She then headed to Crested Butte, Colorado, where she became involved in telemark racing and extreme-skiing competitions.

Rigby joined The North Face Ski Team in 1995 and has since skied in America, Canada, South America, New Zealand, Russia, Asia, Europe, India and even the Middle East. She skied first descents of some of the world's tallest/hardest peaks, including the Five Holy Peaks in Mongolia.

Outside magazine credited her as being: "the best female telemark skier in the known universe", when she appeared on the cover of Women Outside in Fall 1998.

In her 50s, she became engaged to Magnus Wolfe Murray. On February 13, 2024, she was skiing at the Brezovica ski resort in Kosovo on her "Tour de Piste", when she died in an avalanche. Rigby was 54 years old.

== Career highlights ==
- Climb and ski descent of Cho Oyu 26,907 ft (8201m) (credited as the first telemark descent)
- Mongolia Women's Ski Expedition: first ski descents of the Five Holy Peaks of Tavan Bogd (including Kuitan, the highest peak in Mongolia)
- Mt. Waddington Ski Expedition: descent of Mt. Waddington and Combatant Couloir, British Columbia
- Yukon Territories to Dry Bay, Alaska, ski exploration, accessed from the Tatshenshini River
- Hanuman Tibba Women's Expedition: first ski descent of RFHP, a 2500m couloir in the Himachal Pradesh region of India
- Kamchatka Women's Ski Expedition: First ski descent of Mt. Udina & Mt. Zimina, as well as the first female ski descent of Mt. Tolbachik (all telemarked)
- Lebanon Ski Expedition: ski descent of Qornet as-Sawda, 3090m, traverse of the Mt. Lebanon Range
- Mt. Belukha: ski exploration and descent of the highest peaks in Siberia (photos)
- Cotopaxi (5897m) and Chimborazo (6310m) volcanoes of Ecuador: ski descent of world's highest active volcano
- Multiple first descents along Gibb's Fjord, Baffin Island
- Ski and kite Greenland
- 21 peaks in 21 days Bolivia
- Trek of frozen Zanskar River – Ladakh, India

== Films and videos ==
- 1997 Scott Gaffney's Breathe
- 1999 Higher on the Mountain
- 2001 Warren Miller's Cold Fusion
- 2001 Transworld Television: Ski Nomads: A Traverse of Lebanon
- 2001 OLN Adventure Series Mystery Mountain
- 2004 Incognito: Total Telemark 4
- 2006 Shelter from the Storm
- 2009 Edge of Never
- 2015 Ultimate Survival Alaska, Season 3
