= Becca Pizzi =

American marathon runner

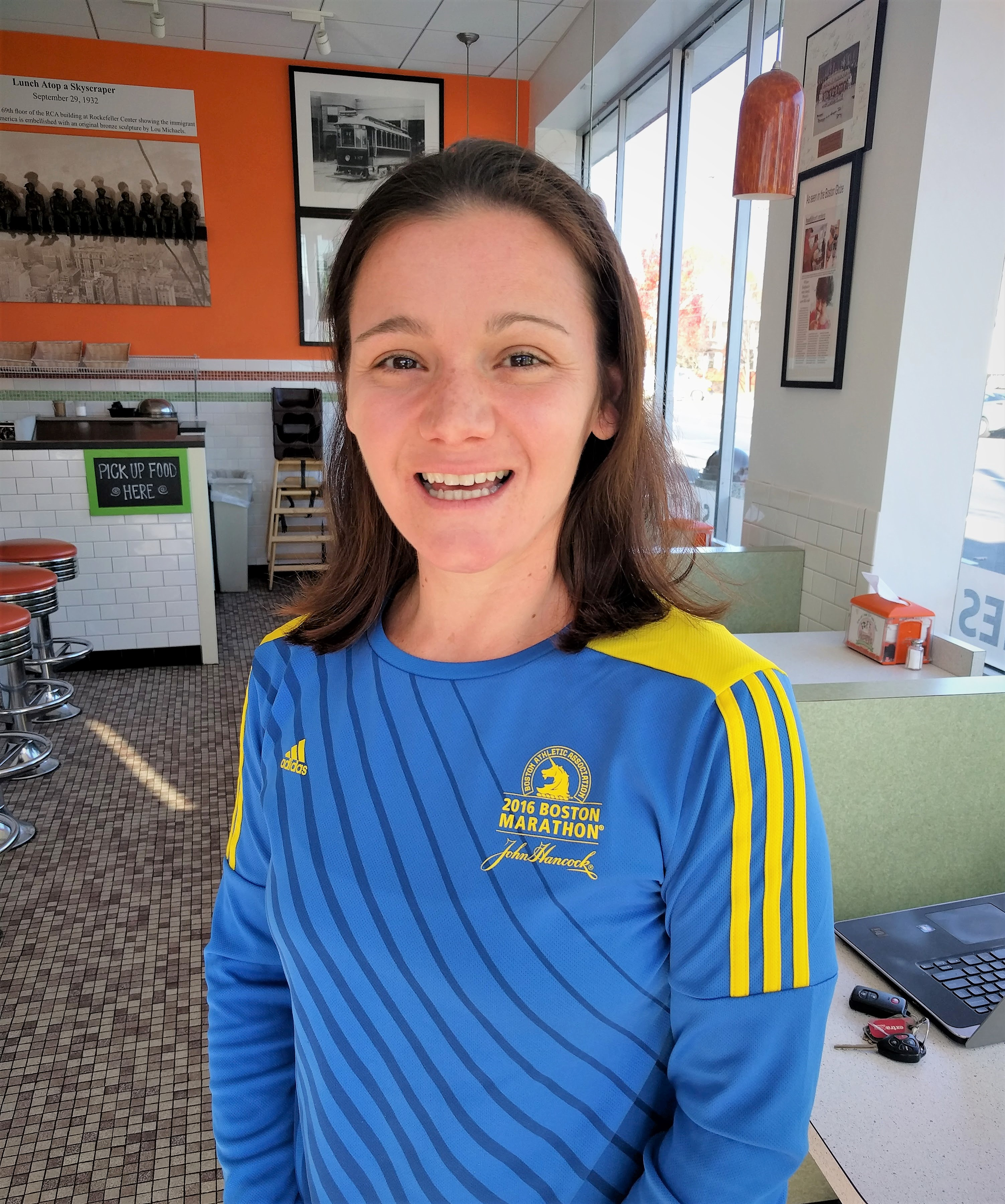
Becca Pizzi in Moozy's, the ice cream shop she manages, in 2016.

Rebecca Pizzi (born 1980) is an American marathon runner from Belmont, Massachusetts. In 2016 she was the first American woman to complete the World Marathon Challenge, a series of seven marathons on seven continents in seven consecutive days, for which she holds the current record. She finished each race well ahead of all the other four women runners, and ahead of nine of the eleven men competitors. In 2018, she became the first woman to complete the World Marathon Challenge twice, again winning the women's overall race, and six of the seven individual marathons.

Starting running at age six with her father, Pizzi ran her first race that year and her first Boston Marathon at age seventeen. She had run it fifteen times by 2015, as well as 45 marathons in 27 states. After college, she started the Belmont Track Club.

== Early and professional life ==
Pizzi credits her father, who ran competitively for the University of Massachusetts, for her running inspiration. She started running with him at the age of six, completing her first race that same year. She graduated Belmont High School in 1998, and Mars Hill College in 2002, competing in track and field and cross country running in both institutions. Her 2000 Mars Hill cross country team was the first such team from Mars Hill to compete at the NCAA National Championship meet. She was part of a South Atlantic Conference championship team for each of four years, serving as the team captain during her senior year. After college, she was a coach for the Team In Training leukemia fundraising marathon program.

She ran her first Boston Marathon at the age of 17, her longest race before college, and had run it 15 times by 2015. Her running goal is to run a marathon in every state, and she had run 45 marathons in 27 states by 2015. Before the World Marathon Challenge, she had never had an injury in 30 years of running.

Pizzi returned to Belmont after graduation, where she started the Belmont Track club. She runs weekly with the Boston Bulldogs Running Club, an addiction recovery support group. Pizzi works two jobs, owning a day care and managing an ice cream parlor. She was a single mother of a young daughter (she continued to run while pregnant, until 2 days before giving birth). Following in her footsteps, her daughter ran her first race at the age of six.

== 2016 World Marathon Challenge ==
Pizzi says that as soon as she heard about the World Marathon Challenge, she knew she had to run it. Only one American, Timothy Durbin, and only one woman, Marianna Zaikova of Finland, had completed the series of seven marathons on seven continents (Union Glacier, Antarctica; Punta Arenas, Chile; Miami, Florida; Madrid, Spain; Marrakesh, Morocco; Dubai, United Arab Emirates; and Sydney, Australia) in seven consecutive days. Pizzi had never been to any continent besides North America. She first consulted her daughter, receiving criticism from her daughter's friends. Her daughter approved, saying: "Mom, finish strong."

External videos
- Belmont Woman Runs 7 Marathons In 7 Days, On 7 Continents, 4:06, February 16, 2016, WGBH News
- Meet the first U.S. woman to complete the World Marathon Challenge, 5:36, February 18, 2016, CBS This Morning

In preparation, which she started January 1, 2015, Pizzi ran 70–100 miles a week before her daughter woke up, then did further training at nighttime, including yoga and cross-training that totaled 30 hours a week. She also continued to work at the ice cream parlor and day care. By the time of competition, she got more sleep on the plane flights during the challenge (seven hours per night), than during her preparation (five hours). Her race preparation received national and international coverage. The entry fee was $36,000. Pizzi had to ask for additional time in order to find sponsors to help cover the cost. Ultima Replenisher, a maker of electrolyte-replacement drinks, Dr. Cool ice wraps, and Lyon-Waugh Auto group, a local car dealership, together covered 75% of the cost. The first two also provided their products to help her run. A Belmont bank hosted an autograph signing session for her departure, donated money in her name to the Belmont Food Pantry, and followed her progress via its website.

On the first marathon, January 23, on a glacier in Antarctica, the sub-zero temperatures made Pizzi's iPod freeze and burst. She would later say it was her least favorite run because of the cold, but also her favorite and most memorable run because of the beauty and silence. Her standard running partner, a Boston attorney, ran with her in Chile. In the North American marathon, in Miami, Pizzi was watched by friends, including the owner of the ice cream shop she manages, and her running coach from Mars Hill. She ran the last six miles with a nine-year-old girl whom she has mentored. After her finish, Pizzi watched the other competitors come in for over an hour before she rested or ate. In Madrid, she was surprised to meet Zaikova, who joined her for half the race. The Marrakesh race was difficult, because it took place only 12 hours later, but she was bolstered by her running partner biking beside her. In Dubai she suffered her first running injury ever, falling and suffering a groin muscle tear during the second mile. To overcome the pain, she thought of New England Patriots quarterback Tom Brady, and his quote "I didn't come this far to just come this far." She completed the race, though running her slowest time of the seven marathons. By the time her plane landed in Sydney for the final marathon, her groin was black and blue and swollen to the size of a softball. She still completed the last race and her boyfriend greeted her at the finish line.

Pizzi finished an average of an hour ahead of all four of the other women competitors in all seven races. Her cumulative time of 27:26:15 hours (an average time of 3:55:11 hours) was declared a world record for the event. Her cumulative time was better than those of nine of the eleven men competing. A fellow American, Daniel Cartica, a U.S. Marine Corps captain from Chicago, won the men's marathon, also in world record time; only he and another U.S. Marine finished faster than Pizzi.

== Post marathon ==
When Pizzi returned home, Belmont held a parade in her honor, and declared February 4 "Becca Pizzi Day". She received certificates of accomplishment from the Massachusetts House, Senate, and Governor. U. S. Representative Katherine Clark read a tribute to her into the Congressional Record. The "Becca Pizzi Family Fun Run", a 5K run, was named after her, and first run in Belmont on April 10, 2016, by 200 people. The ice cream parlor she manages named a flavor after her, "Becca 7", with seven ingredients. She was awarded a "Globie" New England sports award by the Boston Globe. Mars Hill University named her one of two alumni of the year for 2016.

Pizzi continued her 100-mile per week training pace for the 2016 Boston Marathon. Before the marathon, Pizzi was honored along with Boston Marathon legends Bobbi Gibb and Meb Keflezighi by the Boston Athletic Association. On April 17, 2016, the Boston Red Sox let her throw out the ceremonial first pitch, but before she did so, her boyfriend of five years made her the first woman proposed to on the Fenway Park pitcher's mound; Pizzi accepted.

In 2017, Pizzi ran 10 marathons, including pushing with Team Hoyt in the Fenway Park Marathon in September, and running the Volcano Marathon in Chile at 14,000 feet in November 2017. She injured her calf, and received deep tissue massage from Tom Brady's TB12 sports therapy center for two months, while preparing to run the World Marathon challenge again.

== 2018 World Marathon Challenge ==
In 2018, Pizzi became the first woman to run the World Marathon Challenge twice. She was the fastest female racer in six of the seven marathons, and in the overall race, and set a new overall time record.

She won the women's races in Novolazarevskaya Station, Antarctica; Cape Town, South Africa; Perth, Australia; Dubai, United Arab Emirates; and Lisbon, Portugal on consecutive days on January 30 through February 3. She came in second in the women's race in Cartagena, Colombia after taking a wrong turn, then recovered to win the last women's marathon in Miami, United States, on February 5. She said Miami was her most memorable race; she had her telephone stolen with all her photos, but that was made up for by having her husband and family there to cheer her on. She crossed the last 100 yards and the finish line running alongside her daughter, and the race director Richard Donovan gave each a gold medal.

== Continuing running ==
In 2020, Pizzi published an autobiographical children's book, Becca's Feat on Feet (ISBN 978-1645432609, Mascot Books), about her running of her first World Marathon Challenge. Her father contributed the title.

On December 14, 2022, Pizzi returned to Antarctica for a third time to run the Antarctic Ice Marathon, winning the women's race with a time of 4:24:15.

On April 17, 2023, Pizzi coached former Boston Bruins hockey captain Zdeno Chára in running the 2023 Boston Marathon, his first marathon. They ran the race together, finishing hand-in-hand in 3:38:23. In November 2023, Chára and Pizzi ran the Feaster Five Road Race, with Chára as the official race starter.

On May 13, 2023, Pizzi, with Chára encouraging her, ran her first ultramarathon, the Watuppa 50 kilometer race, in Fall River, Massachusetts. She won the race in 3:59:11, beating the women's course record by 35 minutes.

Pizzi completed her goal of running a marathon in all 50 US states on September 24, 2023, by running, and winning, the Jackson Hole Marathon in Wyoming. She brought a support crew of 50 people for her 50th state marathon, including her husband and daughter, and finished in 3:15:41 as the fastest female, and the 10th fastest overall, out of 601 runners.
