= Ryan Hall (runner) =

American long-distance runner

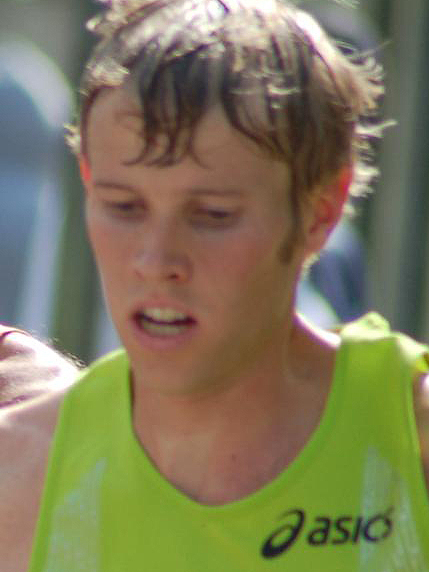
- Hall at the 2007 London Marathon

Personal information
- Born: October 14, 1982 (age 44) Kirkland, Washington, U.S.
- Home town: Flagstaff, Arizona, U.S.
- Height: 5 ft 10 in (1.78 m)
- Weight: 127 lb (58 kg) (2015)

Sport
- Country: United States
- Sport: Athletics/Track, Long-distance running
- Events: Marathon, Half marathon, 10,000 meters, 5000 meters
- College team: Stanford Cardinal
- Club: Asics
- Turned pro: Aug. 2005
- Retired: Jan. 2016

Achievements and titles
- Olympic finals: 2008 Beijing; Marathon, 10th 2012 London; Marathon, DNF
- Personal bests: Outdoor; 5000 m: 13:16.03 (Carson 2005); 10,000 m: 28:07.93 (Palo Alto 2007); Road; Half marathon: 59:43 (Houston 2007); Marathon: 2:04:58 a (Boston 2011)
Medal record
Men's athletics
Representing United States
World Marathon Majors
Bronze medal – third place	2009 Boston	Marathon

Ryan Hall (born October 14, 1982, in Kirkland, Washington) is a retired American long-distance runner who held the U.S. record in the half marathon from 2007 to 2025. Hall is the first American to break the one-hour barrier in the event, and he is also the first American to run a sub-2:05 marathon. However, this time is not eligible to be a record due to the course being point-to-point and a net-downhill course. Hall won the marathon at the 2008 United States Olympic trials and placed tenth in the Olympic marathon in Beijing.

== High school ==
Hall came on the running scene as a high school junior. He graduated from high school in the same year as Dathan Ritzenhein and Alan Webb, behind whom he finished in the 2000 Foot Locker Cross Country Championships. His younger brother, Chad Hall, went on to win the national meet in 2006.

Hall was the California state cross country champion during his junior and senior seasons at Big Bear High School. He finished third at the Foot Locker Nationals in Orlando during his senior season, and also set the Mt. SAC course record in 2000. In track, he was the National Scholastic mile champion in his junior season at 4:06.15, and was the CIF California State Meet champion in the 1600 meter run during his senior season with a state record time of 4:02.62, and won the state title during his junior season in the 3200 meter run at 8:55.12. Hall competed at the Peregrine Systems U.S. Open at Stanford in the 1500 meters, running 3:42.70, and at the 2001 USA Outdoor Track & Field Championships.

== Collegiate ==
Ryan Hall's college career at Stanford University started with injuries that held him back from the promise he showed in high school. In 2001, Hall won the Murray Keating Invitational in his college debut and finished 76th at the NCAA Men's Cross Country Championships. He red-shirted the 2002 track season. In his sophomore year of cross country, he won the Stanford Invitational and the Notre Dame Invitational. He was named first team all Pac-10 and earned All-American honors with his 37th-place finish at the NCAA Championships. He followed this up with a 3:43.37 1500m best his freshman year of track in 2003. The highlight of his collegiate cross country career came in his junior year in 2003. He was named the Pac-10 Cross Country Athlete of the Year after leading Stanford to the NCAA Championship by finishing 2nd to Colorado's Dathan Ritzenhein. His 2004 track season was cut short due to injury but he did record a best of 13:45 in the 5000, which began Hall's change in distance from the 1500. He came back from injury to finish 26th at the NCAA Championships in 2004 to once again earn All-American status. The breakout that everybody expected from Hall since high school took place in the 2005 track season. He earned his first-ever individual NCAA Championship by winning the 5000 meters in 13:22.32, finishing less than a second ahead of his teammate Ian Dobson in a race where the two runners dominated. He graduated from Stanford with a BA in sociology.

== Post-collegiate ==
=== Professional (2005–2010) ===
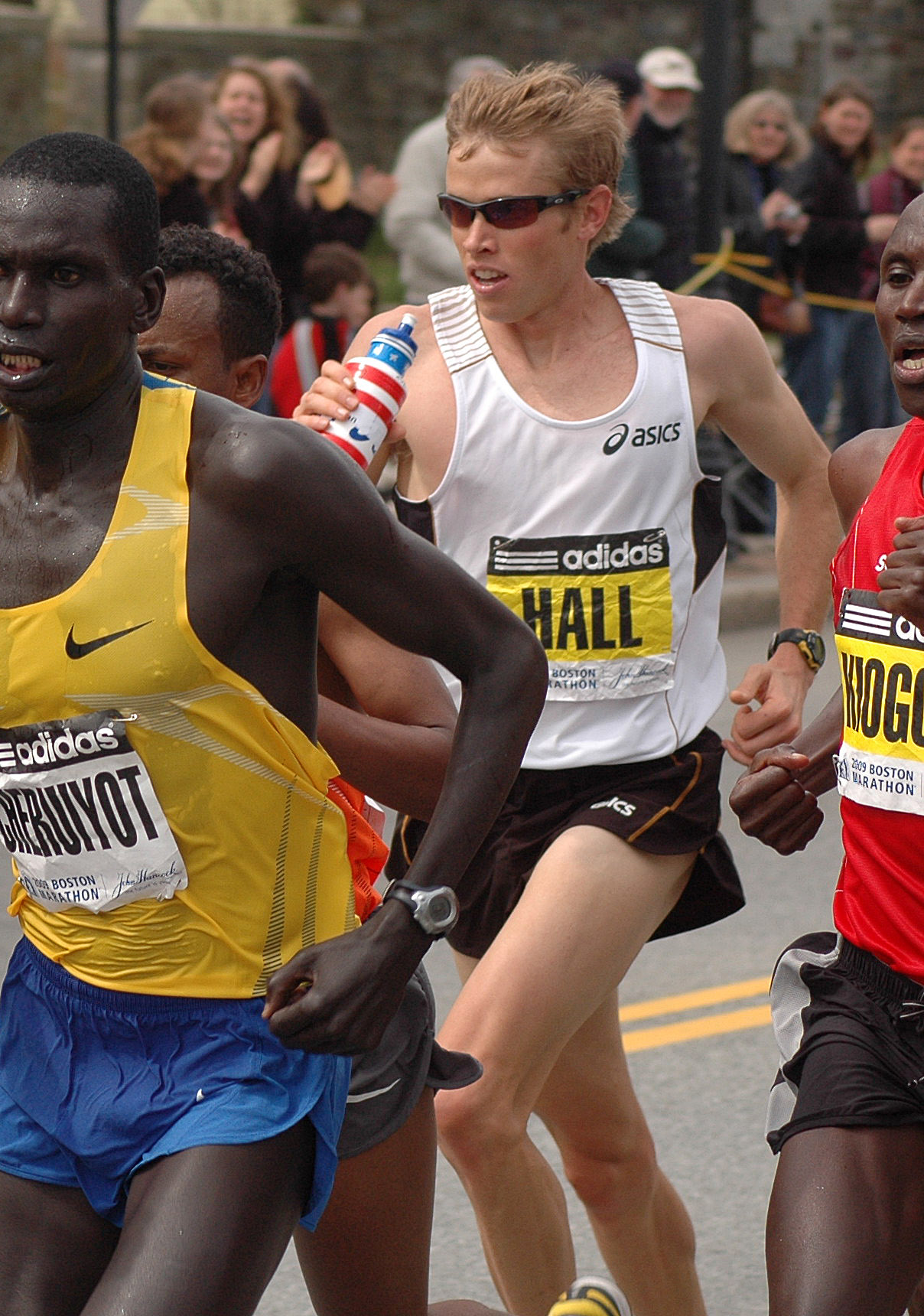
On the way to placing 3rd in the 2009 Boston Marathon. At halfway point in Wellesley Square.

Hall has been sponsored by ASICS since 2005. His coach at the time was Terrence Mahon, a former runner at Villanova University. In 2006, he won his first national title in the 12K cross-country championships, winning by 27 seconds.

On September 16, 2006, Hall won the Great Cow Harbor 10K in Northport, New York, setting a new course record of 28:22. Hall's road-running success continued when he broke the U.S. 20k record on October 8, 2006, running 57:54, 48 seconds faster than the previous record run by Abdi Abdirahman in 2005.

On January 14, 2007, Hall won the Aramco Houston Half-Marathon in a time of 59:43. The performance eclipsed the previous North American record of 1:00:55, set by Mark Curp on September 15, 1985, in Philadelphia.

On April 22, 2007, Hall placed 7th in the Flora London Marathon. His time of 2:08:24 was the fastest marathon debut by any American.

On November 3, 2007, Hall won the 2008 U.S. Olympic Team Trials Marathon in a Trials-record 2:09:02 in New York City, New York. With this win, he, Dathan Ritzenhein, and Brian Sell qualified to run the marathon at the 2008 Olympic Games in Beijing, China.

On April 13, 2008, Hall placed 5th in the Flora London Marathon. Hall, 25, competing in only his third marathon, finished in 2:06:17.

Hall was featured on the cover of the September 2008 Runner's World magazine and talks about his "run for glory" in the marathon in the 2008 Summer Olympics in Beijing. On August 24, 2008, Hall was the second American to cross the finish line the 2008 Men's Olympic Marathon, placing 10th with a time of 2:12:33. He ran at a much more conservative pace than the lead pack did, and gradually moved from 21st place at the 15k mark up to 10th at the 40 km mark. His teammates Dathan Ritzenhein and Brian Sell finished 9th and 22nd, respectively.

Hall was chosen as the 2008 Road Runner of the Year in the Open Male division by the Road Runners Club of America.

On April 20, 2009, Hall participated in the 2009 Boston Marathon, finishing third overall in 2:09:40 behind Deriba Merga of Ethiopia and Daniel Rono of Kenya. Merga and Rono finished with times of 2:08:42 and 2:09:32, respectively. He returned to the race in 2010, but only managed fourth place, although his time of 2:08:41 was the fastest ever by an American at Boston.

In 2010, Hall finished fourth in the Boston Marathon, and fourteenth in the Philadelphia Distance Run half marathon. Due to fatigue, he withdrew from the Chicago Marathon. In October, Hall left his coach Terrence Mahon) and the Mammoth Track Club. He won at the 2010 USA 7 Mile Championships.

=== Sub-2:05:00 at the 2011 Boston Marathon ===
On December 16, 2010, Hall announced that he would be running the 2011 Boston Marathon, marking his third consecutive appearance in the race. On April 18, 2011, Hall ran the fastest marathon ever by an American, 2:04:58, to finish fourth. Kenya's Geoffrey Mutai ran 57 seconds under the recognized world record at the time, in winning in 2:03:02, and credited Hall with setting - and maintaining - a fast early pace. However, this was not an American record, since the Boston course is not eligible for records owing to its point-to-point course and elevation drop of greater than 1 m/km; a strong net tailwind (15–20 miles/hr) contributed to the runners' remarkable 2011 times.

=== 2012 Olympics and 2013 ===
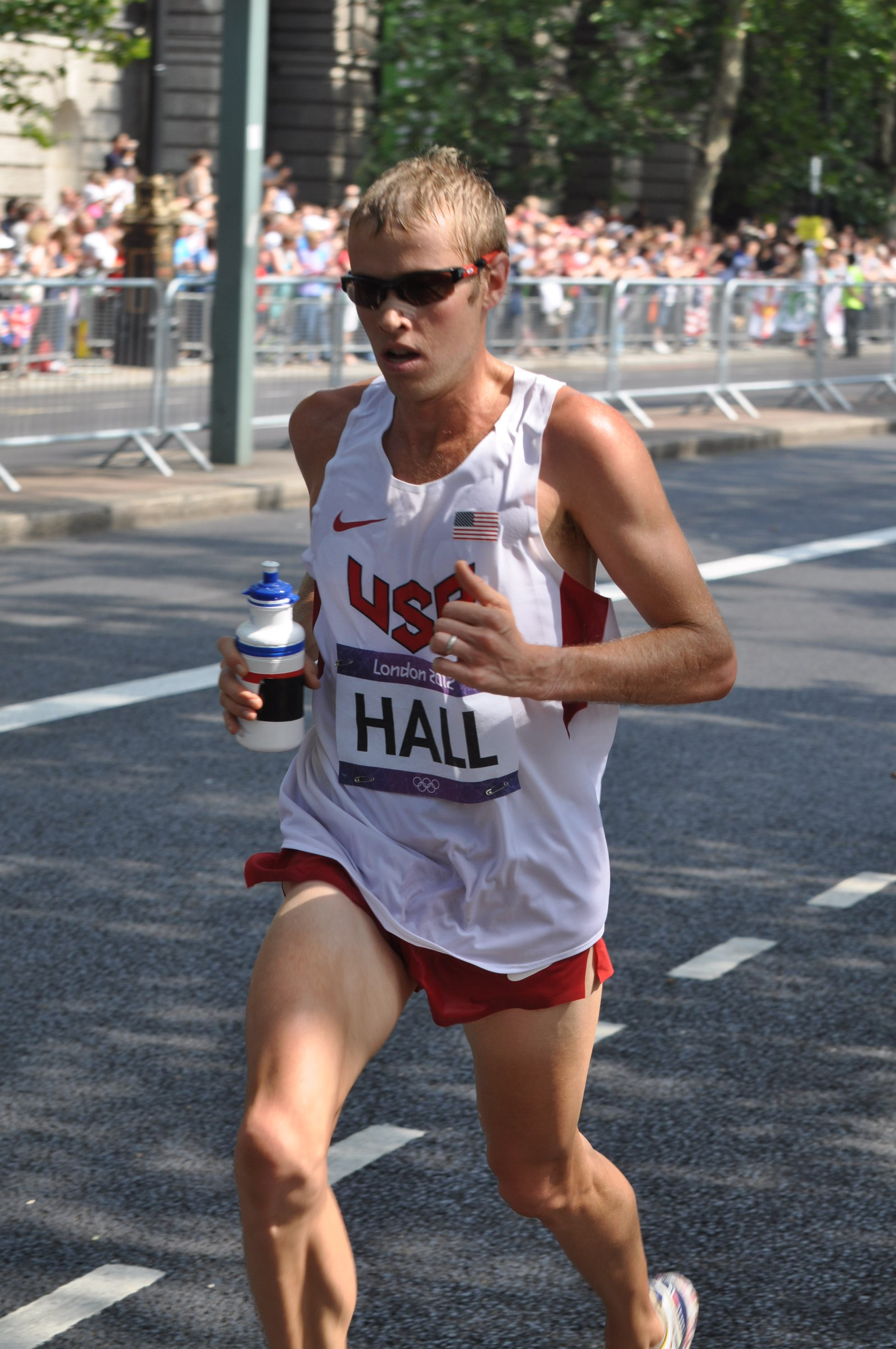
Ryan Hall - 2012 Olympic Marathon

In January 2012, Hall ran a 2:09:30 at the Olympic marathon trials in Houston, Texas. Although leading at the halfway point, Hall eventually finished second behind Meb Keflezighi, still securing a spot on his second Olympic team. At the Olympics in London, Hall dropped out of the marathon around the eleven mile mark while he ran this race with a hamstring injury. After his disappointment at the Olympics, Hall signed up for the New York City Marathon for later that year, but was unable to run it and withdrew from the race (before it was cancelled due to Hurricane Sandy) in September.

In 2013, Hall signed up for the Boston Marathon and the New York City Marathon, but withdrew from both due to injuries.

=== 2014 ===
In April 2014, Hall finished 20th in a time of 2:17:50 at the 2014 Boston Marathon, his first marathon finish since the 2012 Olympic trials. In September 2014, Hall announced that he was being coached by Jack Daniels. Hall announced that he will be running the Utah Valley Marathon in June 2015 but did not record a finish.

In 2014, Hall signed up for the 2014 Utah Valley Marathon and the 2014 TCS New York City Marathon, but withdrew from both due to fatigue.

=== 2015 ===
On March 15, 2015, at the Los Angeles Marathon, Hall took the lead at the start running the first mile in 4:42 at near world-record pace but dropped out at the halfway point after losing touch with the lead pack at the fifth mile. His wife Sara was competing in her first marathon in the same race.

=== 2016 ===
In January 2016, Hall announced his retirement from racing, citing the harmful effects it has had on his body. He took up weightlifting, and increased his bodyweight from 58 kg to 75 kg.

=== 2017 ===
In January 2017, Hall somewhat came out of retirement to run the 3rd Annual World Marathon Challenge. Spurred on and inspired by his friend Matthew Barnett (who also completed the race), Hall left his shoes, literally, at the final finish line in Sydney – a symbolic act to signify the end of his running career.

== Personal bests ==
Event	Time	Place	Date
1500 m	3:42.75	Stanford, California, USA	June 9, 2001
5,000 m	13:16.03	Carson, California, USA	June 24, 2005
10,000 m	28:07.93	Stanford, California, USA	March 31, 2007
10 Miles+	45:33	Houston, Texas, USA	January 14, 2007
Half Marathon	59:43 NR	Houston, Texas, USA	January 14, 2007
Marathon*	2:04:58	Boston, Massachusetts, USA	April 18, 2011
Marathon	2:06:17	London, England, UK	April 13, 2008

(+) En route in race at longer distance
(*) Wind-aided and point-to-point course

- All information except for 10 Miles taken from IAAF profile.

== Achievement chronology ==
- 2000 - 3rd place at Foot Locker National High School Cross Country Championships
- 2003 - 2nd-place at NCAA Cross-Country Championships
- 2005 - NCAA Men's Outdoor Track and Field Championship 5000m
- 2005 - 3rd-place at the USA Outdoor Track and Field Championships in the 5000m
- 2006 - 1st place at the USA Cross Country Championships (12K)
- 2006 - U.S. Half Marathon Champion
- 2006 - 1st place, Great Cow Harbor 10K (Northport, NY); course-record time of 28:22 shattered previous mark of 28:44 set by Jeff Jacobs in 1991
- 2006 - U.S. 20K Record Holder (57:54). Inaugural IAAF World Road Running Championships in Debrecen, Hungary.
- 2007 - U.S. Half Marathon Record Holder (59:43). Aramco Houston Half Marathon in Houston, Texas.
- 2007 - 7th place, 2:08:24 at the London Marathon in London, United Kingdom.
- 2007 - 1st Place, 2008 U.S. Olympic Team Trials Marathon (2:09:02) in New York City, United States
- 2008 - 5th Place. 2008 Flora London Marathon (2:06:17) in London, United Kingdom
- 2008 - 10th Place. 2008 Marathon - Summer Olympics (2:12:33) in Beijing, China
- 2009 - 1st Place. 2009 15K - Publix Super Markets Gasparilla Distance Classics Race (43:26) in Tampa Bay, United States
- 2009 - 3rd Place. 2009 Boston Marathon (2:09:40) in Boston, United States
- 2009 - 3rd Place. 2009 NYC Half-Marathon (1:02:35) in New York City, United States
- 2009 - 1st Place. 2009 ING Philadelphia Distance Run Half-Marathon (1:01:52) in Philadelphia, United States
- 2009 - 4th Place. 2009 ING NYC Marathon (2:10:36)
- 2010 - 4th Place. 2010 Boston Marathon (2:08:40)
- 2010 - 1st Place. 2010 Bix 7 (32:55) (a USA 7 Mile Championship event)
- 2011 - 2nd Place. 2011 USA Half Marathon Championship (1:02:20)
- 2011 - 4th Place. 2011 Boston Marathon (2:04:58)
- 2011 - 5th Place. 2011 Chicago Marathon (2:08:04)
- 2012 - 2nd Place. 2012 Olympic Marathon Trials at Houston (2:09:30)
- 2012 - Did Not Finish. 2012 Olympics Marathon in London, UK
- 2014 - 20th Place. 2014 Boston Marathon (2:17:50)
- 2015 - Did Not Finish, 2015 Los Angeles Marathon
- 2017 - Finished, 2017 World Marathon Challenge (average time 3:39)

== Personal life ==
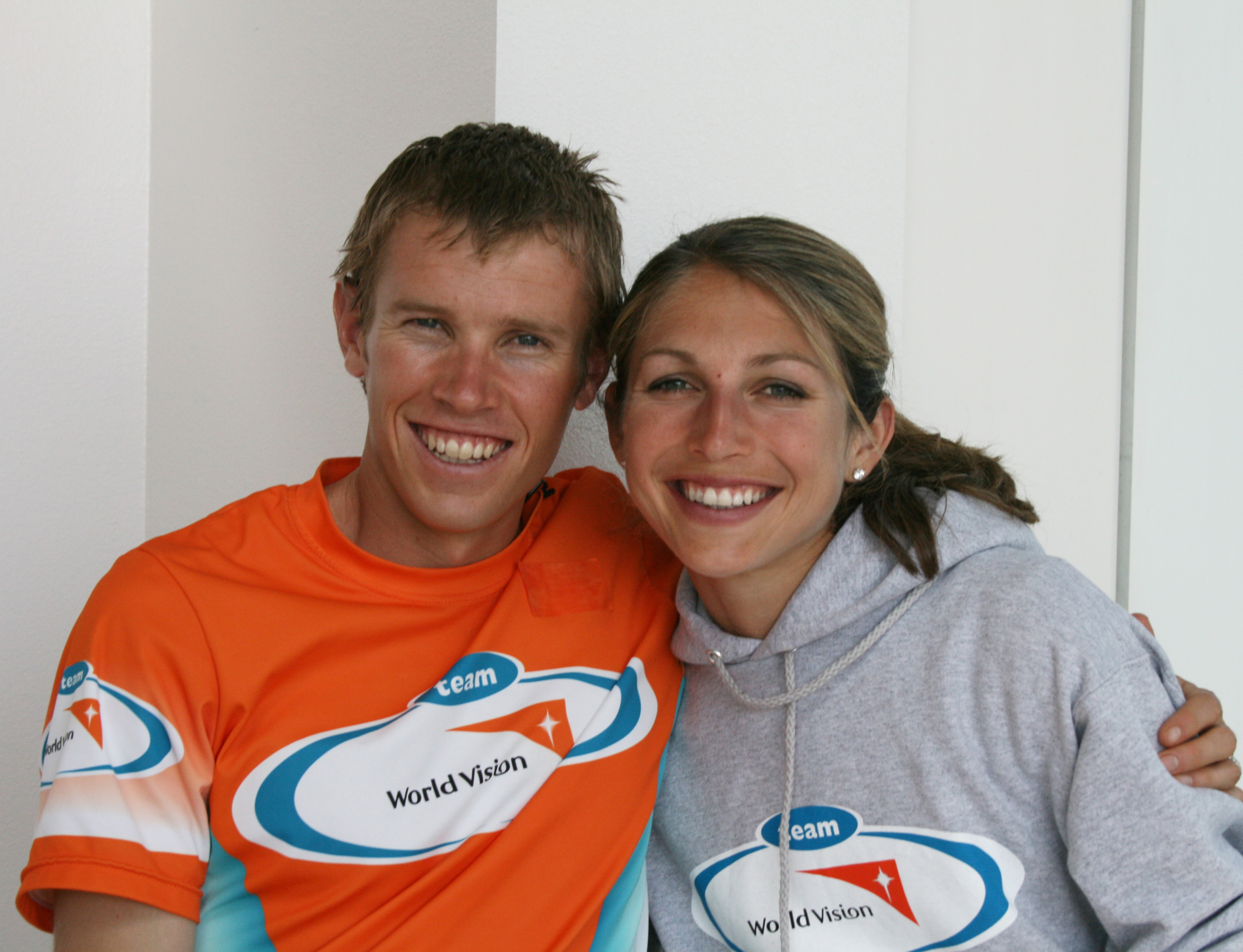
Ryan and Sara Hall

Hall married his college girlfriend Sara Bei, also a professional runner, in September 2005. Ryan and Sara are both devout Christians.

Hall's younger brother Chad won the 2006 Foot Locker National Cross Country Championships, the de facto national championship for high school cross country individual runners. Chad was following in his sister-in-law's footsteps, as Sara Hall (née Bei) won the girl's championships in 2000, the same year Ryan himself finished 3rd. Chad attended the University of Oregon. In 2008, Chad transferred to University of California, Riverside and graduated in 2012.

In 2009, Ryan and his wife Sara formed the Hall Steps Foundation to empower the running community to use the energy and resources that fuel runners' athletic achievements for social justice efforts.

Ryan's home town of Big Bear Lake created the "Move a Million Miles for Ryan Hall" campaign to support Ryan's quest for 2008 Olympic Marathon gold by collectively logging 1,000,000 exercise miles.
