= Sean Burch =

American adventure athlete (born 1970)

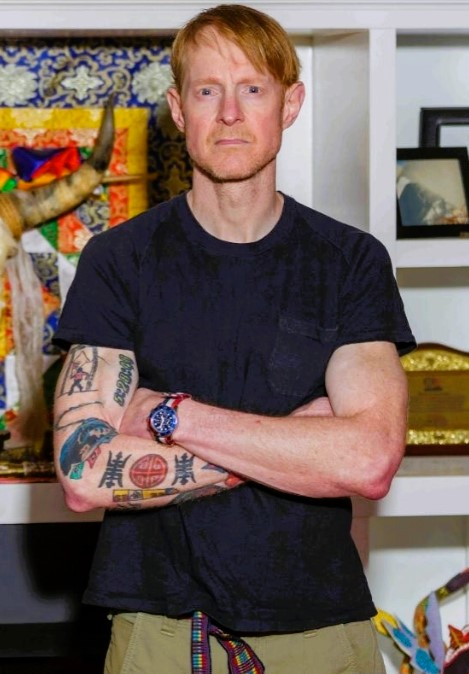
- Sean Burch
- Born: Fairfax, Virginia, U.S.
- Education: Roanoke College
- Occupations: Mountaineer, filmmaker, executive performance specialist, author

Sean Burch is an American explorer, mountaineer, motivational speaker, and documentarian. Burch was the first Virginian to climb Mount Everest, earning him commendation from the Virginia General Assembly in 2004. As of 2022, he held eight World Records. His book Hyperfitness: 12 Weeks to Reaching Your Inner Everest and Getting into the Best Shape of Your Life was published by Penguin Random House in 2007. He is creator and founder of the extreme fitness program Hyperfitness and of Khumbu Productions. In 2010, he was named U.S. Goodwill Ambassador to Nepal by the Nepalese Government; he has also been awarded a medal from the King of Nepal for his solo summit of Mount Everest.

== Early life and education ==
Burch was born in Fairfax, Virginia and graduated from Oakton High School. He studied history at Roanoke College and was part of the Pi Kappa Phi fraternity. While there, he began training in martial arts. He received his black belt in Shotokan before graduating and has since studied and become a certified instructor of Jeet Kune Do and Filipino martial arts. In 2014, he named a peak in Mongolia after the college.

Burch was inspired to start training to be a mountaineer when his grandfather, Norwegian engineer, adventurer, and World War II veteran Hans Schou, admitted from his deathbed that there were "so many things he wished he could have done." In 2001, Burch named a peak in the Wrangell Mountains "Mount Schou" in his honor.

== Expeditions ==
Burch trained for four years to prepare for a solo trek up Mount Everest. In 2000, he climbed in Alaska's Wrangell–St. Elias National Park and was recognized for three first ascents of previously unclimbed mountain peaks. In 2001, he and Dan Mazur reached the submit of Shishapangma in Tibet. The next year, he achieved the fastest American ascent at Aconcagua in Argentina, followed by fourteen first ascents in Gronau Nunatakker region of East Greenland. His Mount Everest climb, wherein he brought no additional oxygen, something only seven people had attempted previously, took place in 2003. He brought non-prescription medical supplies to the local Nepalese population prior to his trek and was accompanied by a sherpa to help carry his gear. He was the first Virginian in history to successfully reach the peak, for which the Virginia General Assembly commended him.

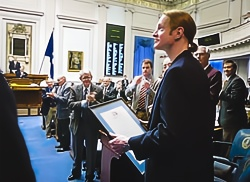
VA General Assembly standing ovation for Sean Burch becoming 1st Virginian to summit Mt. Everest

In 2004, he won first place at the North Pole Marathon. In 2005, he reached the summit of Mount Kilimanjaro in 5 hours, 28 minutes, and 48 seconds; he was recognized for it in the 2008 edition of Guinness World Records. In 2006, Burch achieved a world record for making 63 first ascents in 23 days while climbing solo in Tibet. His record was broken in 2013 by Kilian Jornet, who climbed the mountain in 5 hours, 23 minutes, and 50 seconds. He climbed Mount Fuji in 4 hours and 5 minutes in 2009, earning the world record for fastest winter ascent, and in 2010 completed the Great Himalaya Trail by crossing Nepal via the Himalaya Range from the Indian border to the Tibetan border in 49 days, 6 hours, and 8 minutes. In 2014, he earned 23 first ascents while climbing solo in Mongolia. He also appeared on and won season two of Ultimate Survival Alaska alongside teammates Dallas Seavey and Eddie Ahyakak. In 2016, he claimed another 31 first ascents while climbing solo in Nepal's Humla District. In 2023, he accomplished the world's first solo road-summit-road in less than 18 hours at Monte Pissis, as well as the world's first solo Catamarca-Summit-Catamarca RT in 24 hours at Ojos del Salado.

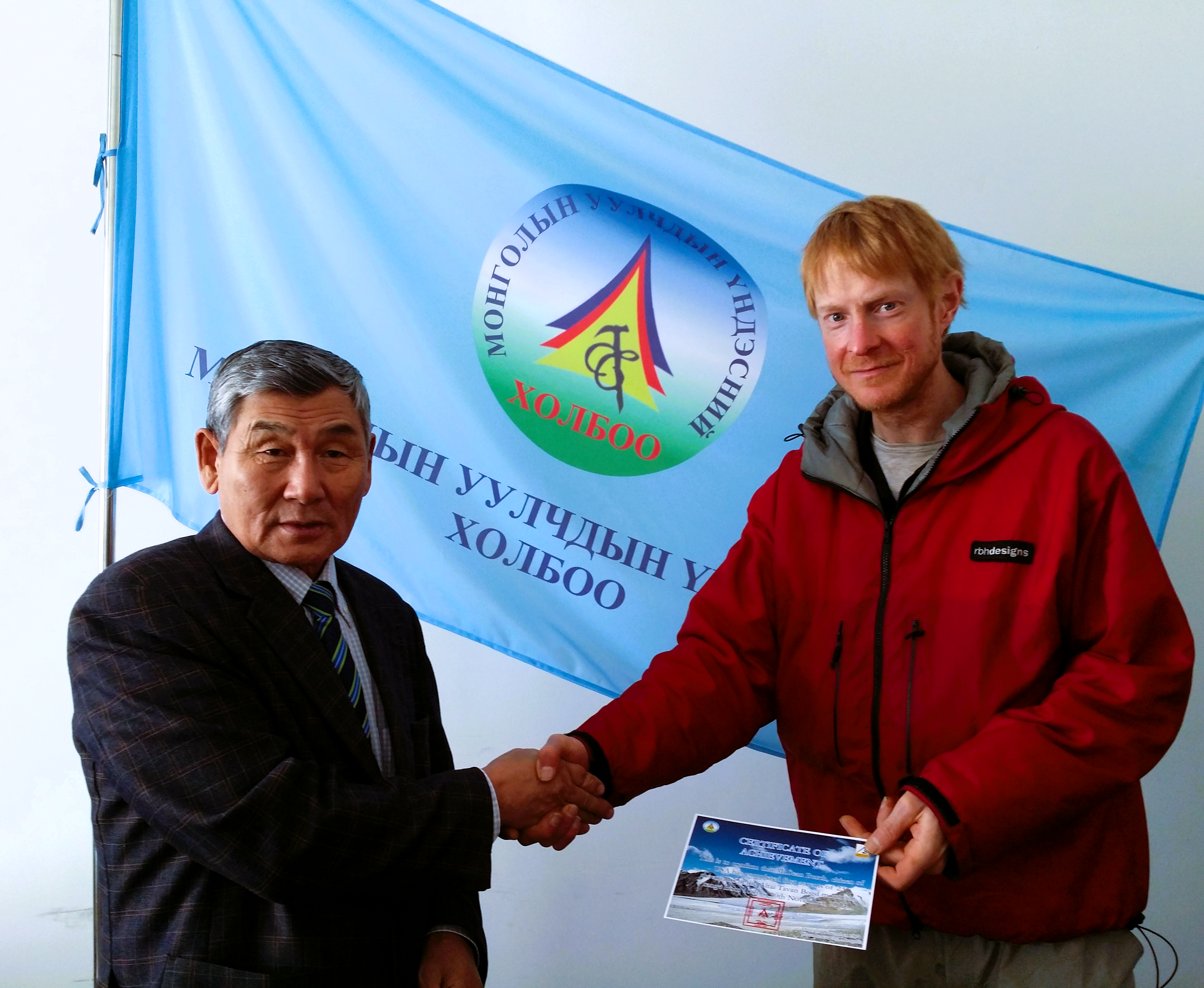
Mongolian National Climbing Federation Ceremony for Sean Burch's world record of 23 first ascents in Mongolia (Ulaanbaatar, Mongolia)

Burch began filming his expeditions in 2003 on Mount Everest as a way to record his solo expeditions in remote regions around the world. He completed his first film, The Icefall Doctor, in 2021. It follows the original icefall doctor, Angnima Sherpa, of the Khumbu Icefall on Mount Everest. He started his own production company, Khumbu Productions, during filming. He served as director, editor, writer, and producer, and assisted with camera and sound. The film was shown at numerous film festivals around the world, winning awards such as the BBVA Award and Silver Edelweiss for Best Mountain Film at the Tórello Mountain Film Festival in 2022 and for Best Mountains, Sports, & Adventure Film at Festival Gorniskega Filma in 2023.

Burch's expeditions have been chronicled by a range of magazines and newspapers, including Reuters, Associated Press, BBC, Outside, Virginia Living, The Virginian-Pilot, CNN, Deccan Herald, WTOP News, and Washingtonian. He has worked with charities, organizations, and campaigns supporting environmental rights, wilderness preservation, cancer prevention, and health and community development within impoverished and remote areas of human habitation in Nepal. He has collaborated and partnered with the Nepal Trust, the Fujisan Club of Japan, Hidden Himalaya, No Kid Hungry, the World Wildlife Fund, Love Hope Strength, ASK Childhood Cancer Foundation, and the Himalayan Rescue Association. He has given presentations on global warming for organizations including The Explorers Club. Burch is an on-going Partner with the National Forest Foundation, PHIT America, and America Nepal Society.

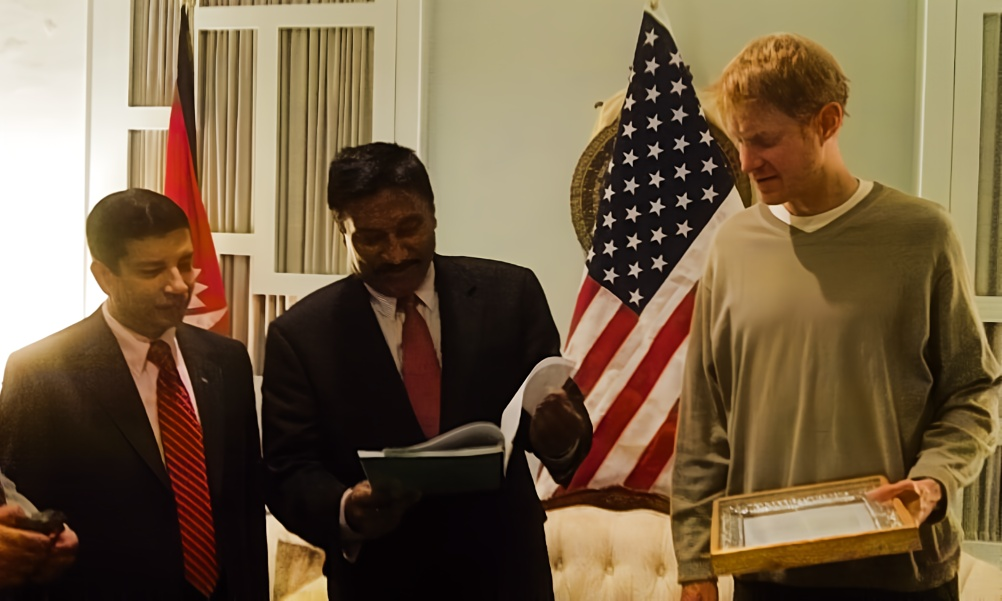
Presentation of the Goodwill Ambassador to Nepal honor to Sean Burch at the Embassy of Nepal in Washington, D.C.

Burch works as a "personal development and leadership specialist" for Fortune 500 companies. His book Hyperfitness: 12 Weeks to Reaching Your Inner Everest and Getting into the Best Shape of Your Life was published by Penguin Random House in 2007. His book Sweatworking: The Mastery Guide to Revolutionizing Your Life & Professional Relationships Through Wellness was published by Wellness Institute Press in 2025.

== Awards and honors ==
Year	Award	Awarding Body	Notes	Refs
2004	Commendation	Virginia General Assembly	Joint House Resolution #218 - Honoring 1st Virginian to Summit Mount Everest	
2005	Guinness World Record: Fastest Ascent of Mt. Kilimanjaro	Guinness World Records	5 hours, 28 minutes, 48 seconds; record broken by Kilian Jornet (5:23:50) in 2013	
2006	World Record		63 summits of unclimbed peaks in 23 days, Tibet	
2009	World Record: Fastest Winter Ascent of Mount Fuji		4:05:42	
2010	U.S. Goodwill Ambassador to Nepal	Nepalese Government	Awarded by Sharat Singh Bhandari	
2015	Brand Personality of the Year	Asia Pacific Brands Foundation		
	Guinness World Record: Jump Rope at Altitude	Guinness World Records	26,181 ft	
	Guinness World Record: Fastest Time for Northernmost Marathon	Guinness World Records	First Marathon and wearing snowshoes	
	Commendation	Virginia General Assembly	Joint House Resolution - Honoring World Record Ascent of Mount Kilimanjaro	
	Distinguished Achievement	Mongolian National Mountaineering Federation	Most First Ascents in Mongolia	
	"Year’s Best" Nomination	National Geographic Adventure		
	"This Year's Greatest Feat"	Men's Journal: The Record Book		
	Adventure Athlete of the Year	Blue Ridge Outdoors Magazine		
	Gold ADDY Award, Photographer	Roanoke College	Magazine Cover	
	Medal	King of Nepal	For solo summit of Mount Everest	

== Personal life ==
In 2001, Burch and married Gabrielle, a schoolteacher, at Mount Whitney in California's Sierra Nevada range. They met when she attended one of his kickboxing classes. They have a son, Hans. In the early 2000s, the family lived in Washington D.C. Burch, now divorced, has since moved to Warrenton, Virginia.
