= Ultimate Survival Alaska =

American reality competition television series (2013–2015)

- Genre: Reality competition
- Country of origin: United States
- Original language: English
- No. of seasons: 3
- No. of episodes: 37

Production
- Executive producers: Brian Catalina; Kristina Wood; John Magennis; Claire Kosloff; Victoria Levy; Peter Goest
- Running time: 60 minutes
- Production company: Brian Catalina Productions

Original release
- Network: National Geographic Channel
- Release: May 12, 2013 – March 22, 2015

Ultimate Survival Alaska is an American reality competition television series produced by Brian Catalina Productions that premiered on the National Geographic Channel on May 12, 2013. The series was executive produced by Brian Catalina, Kristina Wood, John Magennis, Claire Kosloff, Victoria Levy, and Peter Goest.

Ultimate Survival Alaska focused on survivalist men and women who were dropped off in the Alaskan wilderness where they compete with each other in various wilderness races. The survivalists were dropped off by aircraft in the Alaskan wilderness where they compete in races through Alaska's unpredictable weather, barren landscapes, and hostile predators. In May 2015, the series was canceled after three seasons.

== Series overview ==
=== Season 1 (2013) ===
In the first season, 10 episodes document the survivalists' experiences at specific location points during the 3,000-mile (4,800 km) race. The main goal in each episode is to survive using minimal gear, and to reach a certain destination point within 72 hours.

==== Cast ====
- Austin Manelick
- Brent Sass
- Dallas Seavey
- Marty Raney
- Matt Raney
- Tyrell Seavey
- Tyler Johnson
- Willi Prittie

=== Season 2 (2013/14) ===
The second season had 13 episodes and focused on four teams of survivalists with different areas of expertise: woodsmen, mountaineers, military veterans, and endurance athletes. Each team had the task of reaching an extraction point faster than the other teams. There were multiple drop off and extraction points with different terrain for each leg of the contest. In Season 2, the time limit to reach the end of each leg was reduced down to 60 hours.

==== Teams ====
The contestants were divided into four teams of three.

Contestant	Team	Placing
Dallas Seavey	Endurance	1st
Eddie Ahyakak	Endurance	1st
Sean Burch	Endurance	1st
Grady Powell	Military	2nd
Jared Ogden	Military	2nd
Rodolfo Reyes	Military	2nd
Marty Raney	Mountaineers	3rd
Tyler Johnson	Mountaineers	3rd
Thomas Ginn	Mountaineers	3rd
Yote Robertson	Woodsmen	4th
Tina "Timber Tina" Scheer	Woodsmen	4th
Jimmy Gaydos	Woodsmen	4th

==== Results ====
Team	Contestants	Position (by leg)											
Team	Contestants	1	2	3	4	5	6	7	8	9	10	11^{1}	
Endurance	Dallas Seavey, Eddie Ahyakak, Sean Burch	2nd	3rd	3rd	2nd	1st	2nd	2nd	2nd	1st	1st	1st	1st
Military	Grady Powell, Jared Ogden, Rudy Reyes^{2}	1st	4th	1st	3rd	3rd	3rd	1st^{2}	3rd	2nd	3rd	2nd	2nd
Mountaineers	Marty Raney, Tyler Johnson, Thomas Ginn	3rd	2nd	2nd	1st	2nd	1st	3rd	1st	3rd	2nd	3rd	3rd
Woodsmen	Yote Robertson, Tina "Timber Tina" Scheer, Jimmy Gaydos	4th	1st	4th^{1}									

1. The Woodsmen Team was eliminated after missing Extraction due to Jimmy's injury.
2. ^{a} ^{b} Rudy left the competition after Episode 7 due to an injury.
3. Leg 11 was double-length, shown over two episodes. The placements listed in the first column reflect the order teams arrived at the leg's halfway point.

=== Season 3 (2015) ===
==== Teams ====
For season 3 the series remains with the format of four teams of three. Italicized contestants are returning contestants from previous seasons.

Contestant	Team	Placing
Ben Johns	Endurance	1st
Dallas Seavey	Endurance	1st
Lel Tone	Endurance	1st
Scott "Cluck" McCleskey	Lower 48	2nd^{1}
Kasha Rigby	Lower 48	2nd^{1}
James Sweeney	Lower 48	2nd^{1}
Daniel Dean	Military	3rd^{1}
Jared Ogden	Military	3rd^{1}
Grady Powell	Military	3rd^{1}
Tyler Johnson	Alaskans	4th
Marty Raney	Alaskans	4th
Vern Tejas	Alaskans	4th

1. Lower 48 & Military finished tied with 3 points each. However Lower 48 took 2nd place based on 2nd-place finishes: 4-3.

==== Results ====
Team	Contestants	Position (by leg)													
Team	Contestants	1	2	3	4	5	6	7	8	9	10	11	12	13^{1}	Number of points
Endurance	Ben Johns, Dallas Seavey, Lel Tone	1st	1st	3rd	3rd	2nd	4th	2nd	2nd	1st	4th	1st	4th	1st	6
Lower 48	Scott "Cluck" McCleskey, Kasha Rigby, James Sweeney^{2}	4th	4th	2nd	1st	3rd	3rd	3rd^{2}	1st	2nd	2nd	4th	1st	2nd	3
Military	Daniel Dean, Jared Ogden, Grady Powell	2nd	2nd	4th	2nd	1st	1st	4th	4th	3rd	1st	3rd	3rd	4th	3
Alaskans	Tyler Johnson, Marty Raney, Vern Tejas	3rd	3rd	1st	4th	4th	2nd	1st	3rd	4th	3rd	2nd	2nd	3rd	2

1. Leg 13 was worth 2 points.
2. James Sweeney withdrew from the competition after Leg 7 due to pain in his back and worry that he had damaged his artificial hip.

== Episode list ==
=== Season One ===
No. overall	No. in season	Title	Original release date
1	1	"Arctic Hell"	May 12, 2013
2	2	"River of no Return"	May 19, 2013
3	3	"Into the Void"	May 26, 2013
4	4	"Sink or Swim"	June 2, 2013
5	5	"Belly of the Beast"	June 9, 2013
6	6	"Desolation Island"	June 16, 2013
7	7	"Desperate Measures"	June 30, 2013
8	8	"Ice Cold Gamble"	July 7, 2013
9	9	"Beasts of Prey"	July 14, 2013
10	10	"Vertical Hell"	July 21, 2013

=== Season Two ===
No. overall	No. in season	Title	Original release date
11	1	"Arctic Battleground"	December 15, 2013
12	2	"Savage Beasts"	December 22, 2013
13	3	"Over the Falls"	December 29, 2013
14	4	"Climb From Hell"	January 5, 2014
15	5	"River of Fury"	January 12, 2014
16	6	"Hell Hole"	January 19, 2014
17	7	"Vice Grip"	January 26, 2014
18	8	"Guts & Glory"	February 9, 2014
A recap episode covering the main events from the first seven episodes of the season. It also contains some sneak peeks of events that will occur in the final 5 episodes of the season.
19	9	"River of Doom"	February 9, 2014
20	10	"Bear Kingdom"	February 16, 2014
21	11	"Deep Dark Woods"	February 23, 2014
22	12	"The Last Battle"	March 2, 2014
23	13	"Fight to the Finish"	March 9, 2014
24	14	"Game On"	December 28, 2014
A recap episode covering all of the main events from season 2. It also contains a preview of the new teams in season 3.

=== Season Three ===
No. overall	No. in season	Title	Original release date
25	1	"Back for Blood"	January 4, 2015
26	2	"Deadly Descent"	January 4, 2015
27	3	"Crash Course"	January 11, 2015
28	4	"Deadly Tide"	January 18, 2015
29	5	"Devil's Due"	January 25, 2015
30	6	"Rogue Warrior"	February 8, 2015
31	7	"Live Before You Die"	February 8, 2015
32	8	"Savage Waters"	February 15, 2015
33	9	"Kodiak Killers"	February 22, 2015
34	10	"Covert Ops"	March 1, 2015
35	11	"Long Way Down"	March 8, 2015
36	12	"Knockout Punch"	March 15, 2015
37	13	"Final Gauntlet"	March 22, 2015

== Critical reception ==
David Hinckley of the Daily News gave the second season a satisfactory review, saying "things do look consistently harsh and cold, which should satisfy most people who would watch a show about Alaska. The only thing that really looks warm is that big old bear in the brown coat, and he doesn’t look like he’s interested in sharing any of the insulation."
