= David Gething =

Australian ultramarathoner

David Gething is an Australian ultramarathoner based in Hong Kong. He was born in Melbourne but raised in Sydney before moving to Perth for university.

Relentless is the story of his 2015 World Marathon Challenge win, including setting the record for the fastest marathon in Antarctica.
