= Richard Donovan (runner) =

Personal information
- Nationality: Irish

Sport
- Sport: Athletics
- Event: Marathon

Richard Donovan (born c. 1966) is an Irish runner, commercial race organizer, and sports administrator. Donovan organised and was first to complete the inaugural South Pole Marathon in January 2002, then completed the first marathon-length run in the North Pole in April of that year. He used the publicity from this to launch his North Pole Marathon venture, offering runners an adventure tourism experience, with the 2018 event costing €16,000.

Between 30 January and 5 February 2009, Donovan claimed a worlds best for running seven marathons, on seven different continents, in fewer than seven days. Starting 1 February 2012 he improved on this by completing the 7 on 7 in under 120 hours.

Donovan has also completed transcontinental runs across North America in 2015 and Europe in 2016, adding South America in 2017. In addition to the North Pole Marathon, he organizes a number of other commercial events.

== See also ==
- Antarctic Ice Marathon & 100k ultra race
- World Marathon Challenge
- North Pole Marathon
