= Andrew Murray (doctor) =

Scottish doctor and runner

Andrew Murray (born c. 1980) is a Scottish doctor, runner and author who works for the Scottish government promoting physical activity for health. He became widely known in January 2011 when he completed a 2659-mile run from John o' Groats in far north Scotland to Merzouga, in the Moroccan Sahara desert running an average of over 34 miles for 78 consecutive days.

== Medical career ==
Murray was born in Aberdeen, Scotland. He studied at the University of Aberdeen, graduating with a medical degree. He is a general practitioner and additionally works as a Sports and Exercise Medicine doctor for the European Tour Golf, the Scottish Rugby Union, and Heart of Midlothian FC. His professional interests include sports medicine and physical activity for health. Murray was appointed as the Scottish Government's Physical Activity Champion in February 2012 to work for Scotland's Chief Medical Officer, and stated that "Becoming, or staying active, is the single best thing you can do for your health," In March 2012 he re-launched the Scottish Government's "Take Life On" campaign with Sports Minister Shona Robison.

== Running ==
On 9 April 2012 he placed first overall in the North Pole Marathon despite having broken his wrist 10 days prior.

In November 2012 he ran 7 ultramarathons on 7 continents within 7 days to promote the value of exercise for health. He completed 31-mile courses in Antarctica, Patagonia, Atlanta, London, Egypt, Dubai and Australia, where he finished on the Harbour Bridge in Sydney.

On 19 July 2014, together with Donnie Campbell, he ran to the top of Britain's 10 highest peaks in a single day. They completed their trip in 13 hours and 10 minutes, running for a total 9 hours and 10 minutes, with the remainder spent travelling by car between the mountain ranges.

In 2015, Murray and Campbell completed a crossing of the Namib desert. It took the men nine days to complete a 504 km route from Lüderitz to Walvis Bay, running more than 50 km every day on heavy sand.

In February 2016, he won the first Genghis Khan Ice Marathon in Outer Mongolia.

Additionally, Murray has won numerous endurance races which include The Sahara Race (Egypt) (2007), The Gobi Challenge (2009, 2012), the 6633 Ultra (2009), the Indo Ultra (2010), and the Scottish Ultra (2009).

He is the author of "Running Beyond Limits" (published by Mountain Media) which is an anecdotal account of his run from Scotland to the Sahara.
