= William Tan =

Singaporean Paralympian, physician, and motivational speaker

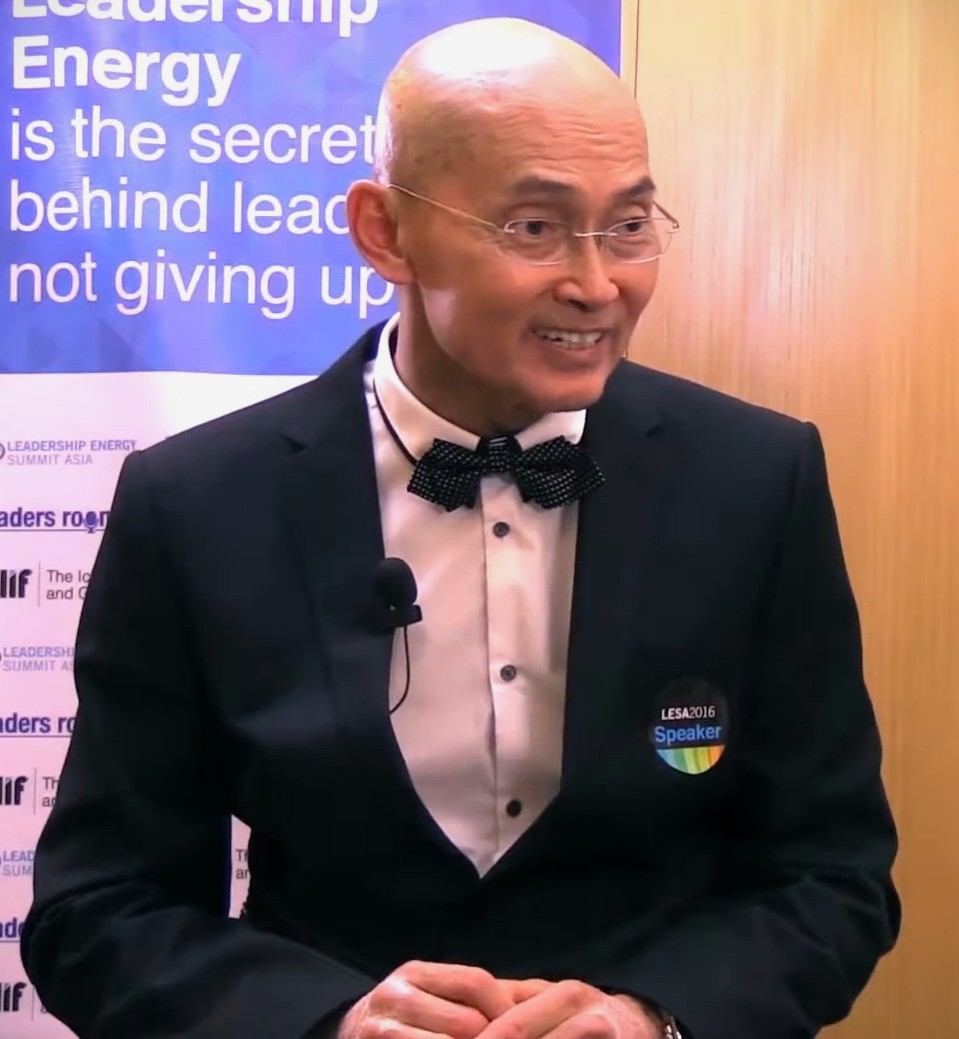
- Tan in 2017
- Born: 1957 (age 68–69); Singapore
- Education: Oxford University, Harvard University

William Tan (born 1957) is a neuroscientist, medical doctor, paralympian and motivational speaker. He was the first person to complete a marathon in the North Pole in a wheelchair.

== Early life and career ==
Tan was born in Singapore. He contracted polio when he was 2 years old, which caused him to be paralysed from the waist down. He studied at Raffles Institution. In 1980, he graduated from Nanyang University (predecessor of NTU Singapore) with a Bachelor of Science. And in 1980 he applied to the University of Singapore's medical school, but was not accepted. Instead, Tan entered the university as a science undergraduate, majoring in biology and psychology. In 1989, he embarked on postgraduate studies, pursuing a master's degree in physiology at Harvard University where he graduated with first class honours as a Fulbright scholar. While in the United States, he pursued a research fellowship in neurosurgery at the Mayo Clinic. In 2002, he pursued a second master's degree in social work and social policy from the University of Oxford under a Chevening scholarship. He also holds a Bachelor of Medicine, Bachelor of Surgery (MBBS) from Newcastle University and a doctorate of philosophy in neuroscience from the University of Auckland.

In 2009, he was diagnosed with stage 4 leukemia, and doctors gave him 9 to 12 months to live. However, through aggressive treatment, his cancer went into remission.

== Sports career ==
Tan competed in the 1988 Seoul Paralympics. He was disqualified from two events for lane violations, because his homemade wheelchair could not drive straight. He competed in the Asian-Pacific games, where he won three gold medals, the World Games and the Commonwealth Games. He holds multiple world records, including the fastest marathon in a wheelchair across the seven continents, and first person to complete a marathon in a wheelchair on the North Pole. He has taken part in over 100 marathons.

Tan also plays badminton competitively.

Tan uses marathons and other physical challenges as a means to raise money for charity. Events include hand-cycling from London to Paris and participating in ultramarathons. In total he has raised over 18 million dollars for charity. He received the Commonwealth Point of Light award for his fundraising.

== Awards and honors ==
- 2005: The National University of Singapore's Distinguished Alumni Award
- 2018: Commonwealth Points of Light Award
