= Antarctic Ice Marathon & 100k ultra race =

Annual athletics event held in Antarctica; established by Richard Donovan

The Antarctic Ice Marathon was established by Richard Donovan and Polar Running Adventures to enable marathon runners to complete a marathon on all seven continents. It also enables athletes to complete the marathon grand slam – a marathon on all seven continents and the North Pole.

Runnings of the Antarctic Ice Marathon and 100 km (62 mi) race have taken place at 80° south just a few hundred miles from the South Pole at the foot of the Ellsworth Mountains. Participants are flown from Punta Arenas, Chile to the race location in the interior of the Antarctic and experience sub-zero temperatures and 24 hours of daylight while there.

On 9 November 2026 the humanoid robot Qestdr had started with a warm jacket, but the battery run empty after 3 km.

== Results ==
Year	Men's Half Marathon Winner	Women's Half Marathon Winner	Men's Marathon Winner	Women's Marathon Winner	Men's 100k Winner	Women's 100k Winner
January 2006	No runners	No runners	(Russia) Evgeniy Gorkov	(United Kingdom) Wendy MacKinnon	(Republic of Ireland) Richard Donovan	No runners
December 2006	No runners	No runners	(France) Henri Alain d'Andria	(United States) Noelle Sheridan	(Republic of Ireland) Richard Donovan	No runners
2007	No runners	No runners	(Belgium) Marc de Keyser	No finishers	(Austria) Christian Schiester	(United Kingdom) Susan Holliday
2008	No runners	No runners	(United Kingdom) Miles Cudmore	(Finland) Kirsi Montonen	(Belgium) Marc de Keyser	(Canada) Pushpa Chandra
2009	No runners	No runners	(United States) Jason Wolfe	(Australia) Richelle Turner	(Republic of Ireland) Richard Donovan	No runners
2010	No runners	No runners	(Brazil) Bernardo Fonseca	(United Kingdom) Clare Apps	(Brazil) Bernardo Fonseca	(United Kingdom) Clare Apps
2011	(Canada) Chad Bruce	No runners	(France) Clément Thévenet	(United Kingdom) Yvonne Brown	(France) Clément Thévenet	No runners
2012	(United Kingdom) Grant Nethercott	No runners	(United Kingdom) Andrew Murray	(Australia) Demelza Farr	(Belgium) Marc de Keyser	(Australia) Julianne Young
2013	(United Kingdom) Rob Taylor	(Japan) Kazue Tajima	(Czech Republic) Petr Vabroušek	(United Kingdom) Fiona Oakes	(Czech Republic) Petr Vabroušek	(United Kingdom) Audrey McIntosh
2014	(China) Huaqian Li	(Hong Kong) Winnie Lo	(Belgium) Marc De Keyser	(France) Frédérique Laurent	(China) Chen Penbin	(Romania) Adriana Istrate
2015	(New Zealand) Ben Comesky	(United Kingdom) Clare Ainsworth	(United Kingdom) Paul Webb	(Chile) Silvana Camelio	(Republic of Ireland) Keith Whyte	No runners
2016	(Israel) Adam Unger	(Canada) Alex Sinclair	(Republic of Ireland) Gary Thornto	(Poland) Joanna Mędraś	(United States) Griff Griffith	(Singapore) Angela Chong
2017	(Belgium) Riet Van De Velde	(United Kingdom) Jenny Bouwsema	(Denmark) Frank Johansen	(United States) Kelly McLay	(Belgium) Kurt Alderweireldt	(Hong Kong) Jennifer Cheung
2018	(New Zealand) Ben Comesky	(Canada) Monica Dauenhauer	(Poland) Piotr Suchenia	(Lithuania) Roma Puišienė	Not held	
2019	No runners	(Denmark) Nanna Petersen	(United States) William Hafferty	(Czech Republic) Lenka Fryčová	Not held	
2021	(Slovakia) Robert Vrabel	(United Kingdom) Lucy Dowland	(Poland) Grzegorz Bogunia	(Latvia) Evija Reine	Not held	
2022	(Czech Republic) Max Balkhausen	(Chile) Silvana Camelio	(Republic of Ireland) Seán Tobin	(United States) Becca Pizzi	Not held	
2023	(Chile) Jose Ignacia	(France) Melanie Vallet	(United States) Michael Higgins	(United States) Stephanie Estridge	Not held	
2024	(Chile) Mauricio Cabezas Vallejos	(Canada) Victoria Grahn	(Italy) Andrea Bonanomi	(United States) Liesl Muehlhauser	(China) Yusheng Ni	
2025	(Chile) Fernando Castillo	(Canada) Gillian Evans	(Russia) Denis Nazarov	(Australia) Catherine Drysdale		
November 2026						

=== Other Events ===
Location within Antarctica of Union Glacier Camp, site of the start and finish points.

2007

- 80 South Half-Marathon Winner – Mahe Bertrand (France)
- Wheelchair Marathon Winner – Tan William (Singapore)

2008

- White Continent Half-Marathon Winner – Frank Staples (United Kingdom)

2011

- 100 Mile Polar Centenary Run – Richard Donovan (Republic of Ireland)

2014

- Antarctic 10 km Winner – Phillipe Laurent (France)

2018

- Women's 10 km Winner – Annie Young (United States)
- Men's 5 km Winner – Hua Xie (China)

2019

- Women's 10 km Winner – Nancy Driscoll (United States)
- Roy Svenningsen (Canada) becomes the oldest man to complete the Antarctic Ice Marathon at 84 years old.

2025

- Catherine Drysdale was the outright winner of the marathon, leading both men's and women's fields
- Antarctic backwards mile - Frederic Aubry (Canada)
- Domitilia Dos Santos (Portugal) became the oldest woman to complete the Antarctic Ice Marathon at 70 years old, with a time of 7:43:14.

== See also ==
- Antarctica Marathon
- The Last Desert
- North Pole Marathon
