= Antarctica Marathon =

For-profit athletics race

- Date: March
- Location: Antarctica (King George Island)
- Event type: Road
- Distance: Marathon
- Established: 1995
- Website: Antarctica Marathon
- Participants: 116 (2019)

The Antarctica Marathon may have been the first for-profit sporting event held in Antarctica, on January 28, 1995. The event is now held every year in late February or early March. The 42.195-kilometre (26 mi 385 yd) race is held on King George Island, one of the largest Antarctic Islands just off the Antarctic Peninsula. There is also a half-marathon held at the same time. The start and finish is at Bellingshausen Station (the Russian base), and the course passes the Artigas Base (Uruguayan), the Frei Base (Chilean) and the Great Wall Base (Chinese). The course follows a gravel road that connects the bases and changes each year based on the base operations as well as road and weather conditions.

== History ==
Thom Gilligan, Founder and CEO of Marathon Tours & Travel, organized the first race in 1995. In 2001, safety concerns prevented the zodiac boats from transporting race participants from the ship to the shore. The marathon was held by running 442 laps around Deck 6 of the ship. The 22nd running of the Antarctica Marathon & Half-Marathon took place in January and February 2022.

== Other marathons in Antarctica ==
=== McMurdo Marathon ===
The first marathon held in Antarctica may have been near the American research base, McMurdo Station, in January 1995. The annual marathon is free and is open to employees and grantees of the United States Antarctic Program, United States Air Force personnel on duty at McMurdo Station, as well as Kiwis from New Zealand's nearby research station, Scott Base. Many participants run the full marathon. However, a half marathon option is available. Some participants elect to ski the course. In January 2015, McMurdo Station hosted possibly the first known Ultra Marathon over 48 km (30 mi) on the continent.

=== South Pole ===
The South Pole has also witnessed runners braving conditions to complete a full 42.195 km (26 mi 385 yd) race. Both for-profit and free events have been held outside the Amundsen–Scott South Pole Station. The South Pole is possibly the first known location of an ultramarathon on the continent, when defining an Ultra as any race greater in length than a marathon.

== Past results ==
Year	Men's Winner	Time (h:m:s)	Women's Winner	Time (h:m:s)
2007	Matt Tyler (GBR)	3:51:33	Christina Harding (USA)	4:54:50
2008	Robert Celinski (POL)	3:09:43	Catharina Schilder (NED); Maria Schilder (NED)	4:21:42
2009	Kornelis Brienne (NED)	3:04:50	Lisa DeYoung (USA)	4:07:57
2010	Robert Youngren (USA)	3:50:02	Kathryn Youngren (USA)	3:58:59
2011	Michael Hewitt (GBR)	3:25:49	Diana Kenna (USA)	4:26:29
2012	Terence Bell (AUS)	3:07:58	Brooke Curran (USA)	4:36:53
2013	Alan Nawoj (USA)	3:29:56	Inez-Anne Haagen (NED)	3:41:52
2014	Bartosz Mazerski (POL)	3:17:55	Stephanie White (NZL)	4:23:03
2015	Andrew Morris (USA)	3:27:02	Debra Patskowski (USA)	3:57:20
2016	Maxime Bondue (FRA)	3:15:24	Sharon-Elise Ryder (AUS)	3:38:03
2017	Luan Huynh (DEN)	3:24:22	Lesley Mettler (USA)	4:06:14
2018	Todd Lubas (USA)	3:07:20	Wendi Campbell (CAN)	3:58:52
2019	Nikolas Adair (GUA)	3:31:01	Suzanne McKeen (AUS)	4:36:55
2020	Cancelled due to COVID-19 pandemic			
2021	Cancelled due to COVID-19 pandemic			
2022 (Jan)	Priit Jaagant (EST)	3:56:32	Sandy Lam (USA)	4:04:41
2022 (Feb)	Ryan Beberus (USA)	3:58:16	Ember Verma (USA)	4:22:59
2024 (I)	Joseph Perry (CAN)	4:15:11	Katherine Shank (USA)	4:07:32
2024 (II)	Blake LaBathe (USA)	3:38:51	Candice Brown (USA)	4:25:37
2025 (I)	Nicholas Husson (USA)	3:37:13	Lisa Dosch (USA)	3:55:47
2025 (II)	Terry Beacom (USA)	4:10:40	Nicola Busca (CHE)	4:17:04

== See also ==
- The Last Desert
- Antarctic Ice Marathon
