= World Marathon Challenge =

Annual marathon

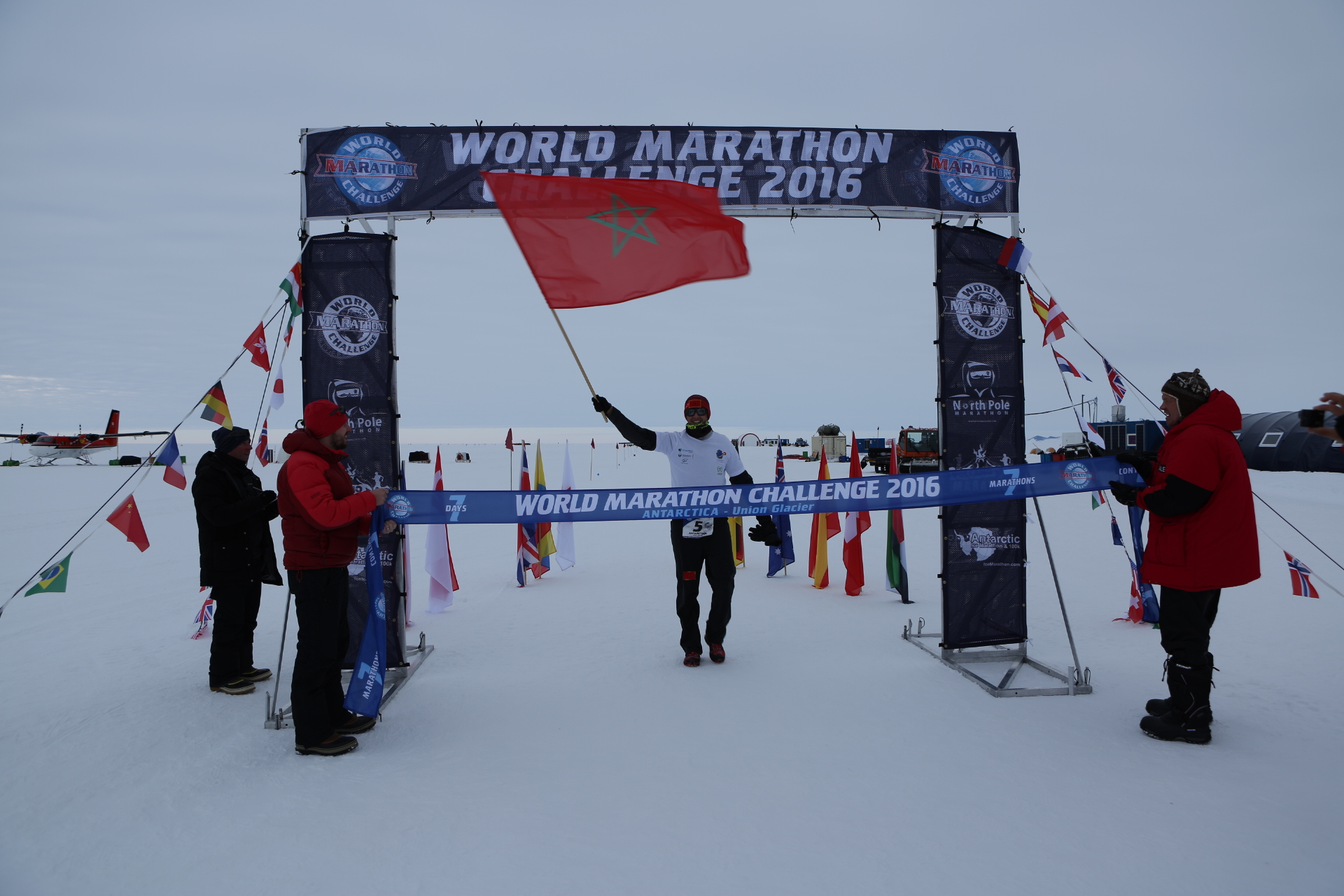
Antarctic leg of the challenge in 2016

World Marathon Challenge is a multievent marathon competition that involves completing seven full 26.2-mile (42.2 km) run marathon races on seven continents in seven days.

== History ==
The first World Marathon Challenge was held in 2015, beginning in Antarctica on January 17, 2015, and ending in Sydney. The inaugural event combined the race results from Antarctica, Chile, the United States, Spain, Morocco, United Arab Emirates and Australia. David Gething won the inaugural event with a total time for all seven races combined of 25 hours, 36 minutes and 3 seconds, and an average time of 3:39:26 per race, against a field that included eleven other runners, ten of whom were male. In order to reach all of the stages of the marathon competition, the participants traveled a total of 38,000 kilometres (23,612 mi). Marianna Zaikova of Finland became the first woman to complete the event as the only successful woman in the 2015 field.

The 2016 event began on January 26, 2016, with certified marathon courses in Union Glacier (Antarctica), Punta Arenas (Chile), Miami (United States), Madrid (Spain), Marrakesh (Morocco), Dubai (United Arab Emirates) and Sydney (Australia). Registration for the event was €32,000. In 2016 Becca Pizzi became the first American woman to complete the event, while finishing first among the women runners, with a total time of 27:26:15 hours and an average time of 3:55:11 hours. United States Marine Corps captain Daniel Cartica won the race with a total time of 24:46:56 and an average time of 3:32:25, besting a field of thirteen other runners and setting a new world record for the event.

In 2017, American Michael Wardian won in 19:21:36 (averaging 2:45:57 per marathon), which was a new world record, and in the women's race Chilean Silvana Camelio won in 29:28:17. In 2018, the men's race was won by Irish Gary Thornton in 22:26:16 and the women's race by American Becca Pizzi (who also won in 2016) in 28:32:35.

In 2019, the marathon courses were in Novo (Antarctica), Cape Town (South Africa), Perth (Australia), Dubai (United Arab Emirates), Madrid (Spain), Santiago (Chile) and Miami (USA). The men's edition was won by American Michael Wardian in 20:49:30 and the women's edition was won by British Susannah Gill in 24:17:6 (initially reported as 24:19:09). With an average of 3:28:9 per marathon, Gill's time was a new world record for women, which was surpassed the following year by Danish Kristina Schou Madsen with 3:25:57 per marathon (total time 24:1:40). The 2020 race was also unusual for other reasons; since it happened during the COVID-19 pandemic, seven of the people who had planned on participating were unable to do so, and because of extreme weather preventing the plane from flying to Antarctica for the first day's run, Cape Town instead became day one with Antarctica on day two.

In February 2023, Darren Edwards became the first person with a disability to complete the World Marathon Challenge.

== Similar events ==
On November 14, 2024, the Great World Race held its inaugural race, also with seven marathons across seven continents, with an entrance fee of $52,000. This race was run by well known runners such as Jenny Simpson, Ashley Paulson, and David Kilgore. Youtuber Michelle Khare competed in November 2025.
