= Homer House =

Historic building in Belmont, Massachusetts

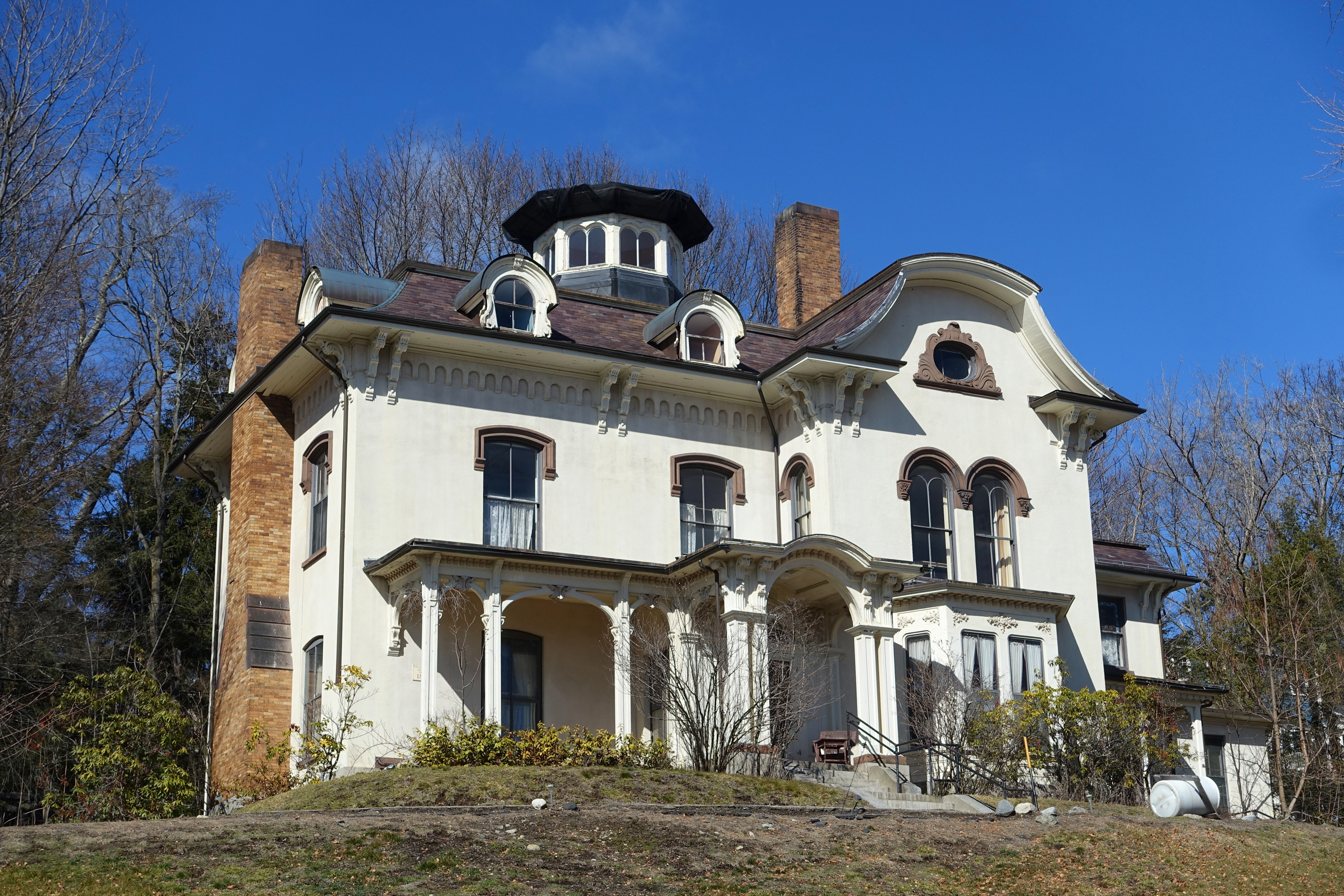
- Belmont Woman's Club, the William Flagg Homer House, in 2017
- Interactive map of the Homer House area

General information
- Architectural style: Mansarded Italianate
- Location: 661 Pleasant Street, Belmont, Massachusetts, US
- Coordinates: 42°23′50″N 71°10′40.7″W
- Year built: 1853

Technical details
- Floor count: 3
- Grounds: 54,854 square feet (5,096.1 m^{2})

Other information
- Number of rooms: 15

Homer House, or the William Flagg Homer House, is a historic house on Pleasant Street in Belmont, Massachusetts, United States, built in 1853 by a wealthy Boston merchant, and used by his nephew, artist Winslow Homer, as the setting of several of his works. It serves as the headquarters of the Belmont Woman's Club which bought it in 1927 to save it from demolition. The club uses the house as the setting of many of its community events, while the club and its members act as the house's stewards, preserving and restoring it. In 1979 Homer House was listed on the National Register of Historic Places as part of the Belmont Pleasant Street Historic District.

== House ==
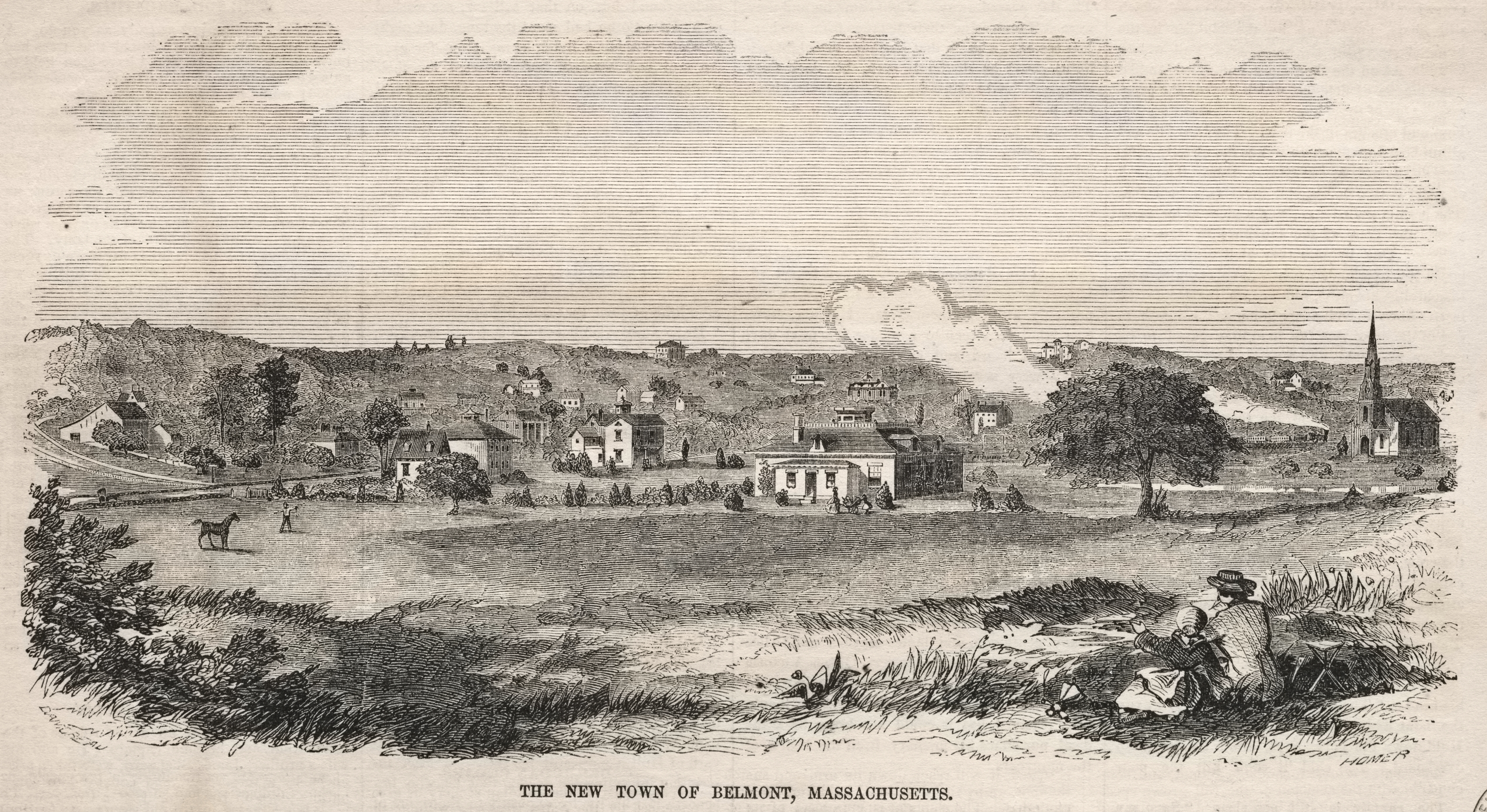
The New Town of Belmont, Massachusetts, Winslow Homer, 1859

Homer House is a 15-room mansarded Italianate mansion built in 1853, on a hill overlooking Belmont town hall and town center. At the time, the house was part of West Cambridge, Massachusetts, and became part of Belmont when that town was founded in 1859. Franklin Tucker of Patch described the house as having a "magnificent circular staircase in the grand foyer, exquisite artisan work, likely produced by early Italian immigrant workers, 1850 circa tiles and brass tub in the up-stair bedrooms, and original chandeliers and stain glass windows and rotunda." A cupola provided cooling for the building.

The house includes "the original metal-lined cold storage room in the kitchen ... an oval-shaped dining room with curved doors, sitting parlors with bay windows, and a magnificent library with oak paneling and its huge brick fireplace." There is a non-original 1870s iron stove in the kitchen.

The hill, the only USGS-listed hill in Belmont, was named Wellington Hill after American Revolutionary War Colonel Jeduthan Wellington (1750–1838), who built a chartered turnpike road on it and used his oxen to help travelers' wagons ascend it. The land the house stands on was part of 14 acres (5.7 ha) originally purchased by Roger Wellington, a prominent early settler, in 1636. It was passed on within the Wellington family for generations, until the nineteenth century when it was sold in 1826 for US$400 to Jeduthan Wellington's son-in-law Samuel O. Mead, then by him for $5,000 to another Wellington son-in-law, William Flagg Homer.

== Homer family ==
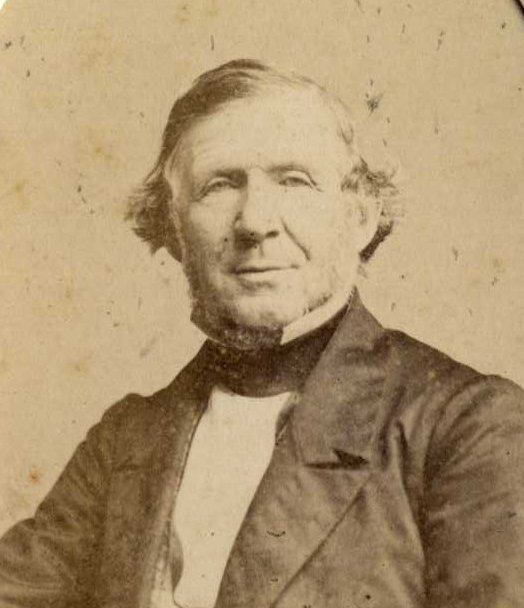
Boston merchant William Flagg Homer

The house eponym, William Flagg Homer, was a wealthy Boston merchant. The house was built for him and his wife, Adeline Wellington Homer, to use as a summer residence. Their daughter Agnes married Boston cotton merchant William E. Stowe who built the stick style Stowe House in Belmont to the west of Homer House.

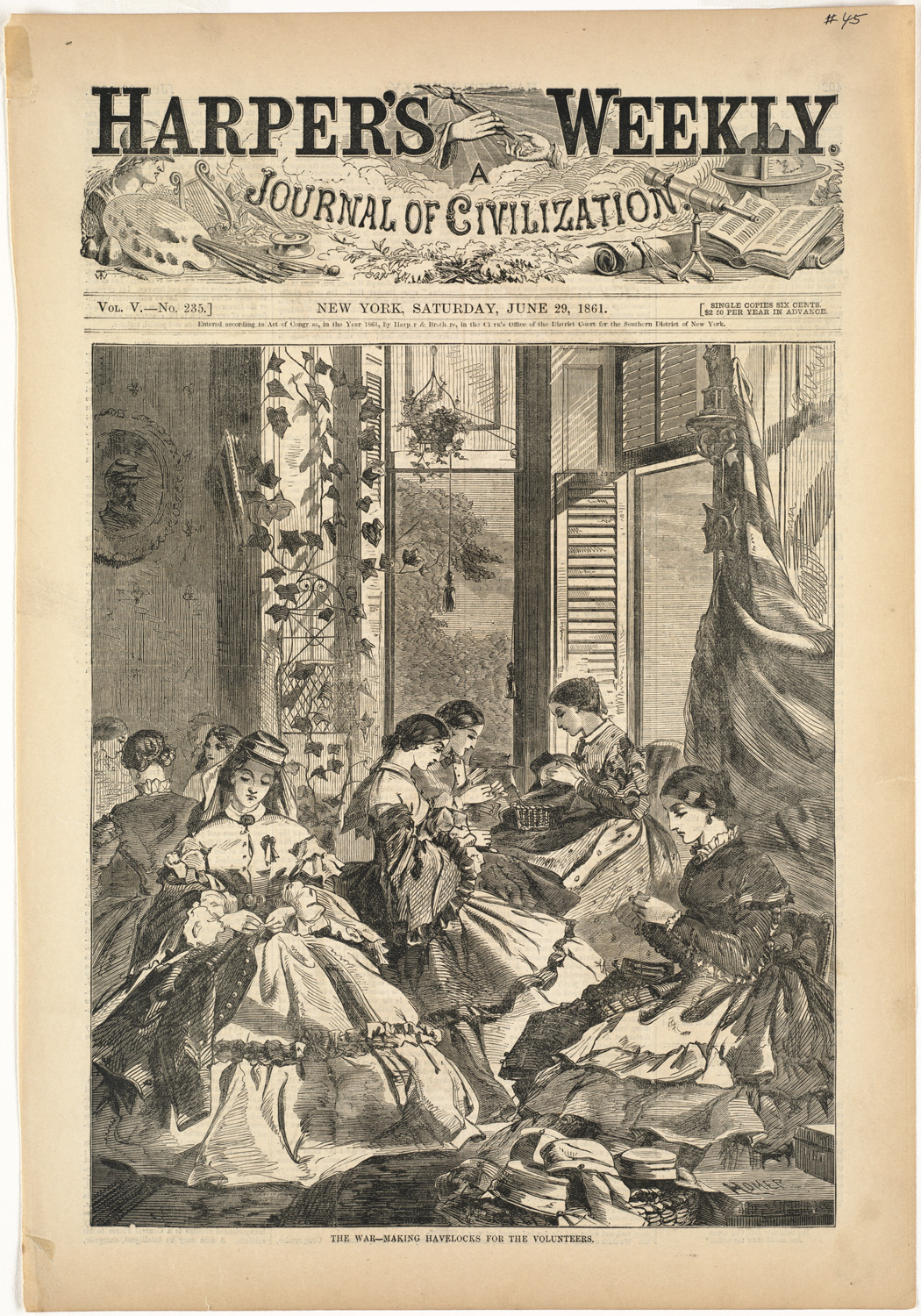
"The War — Making Havelocks for the Volunteers", Winslow Homer, Harper's Weekly, Volume V, June 29, 1861

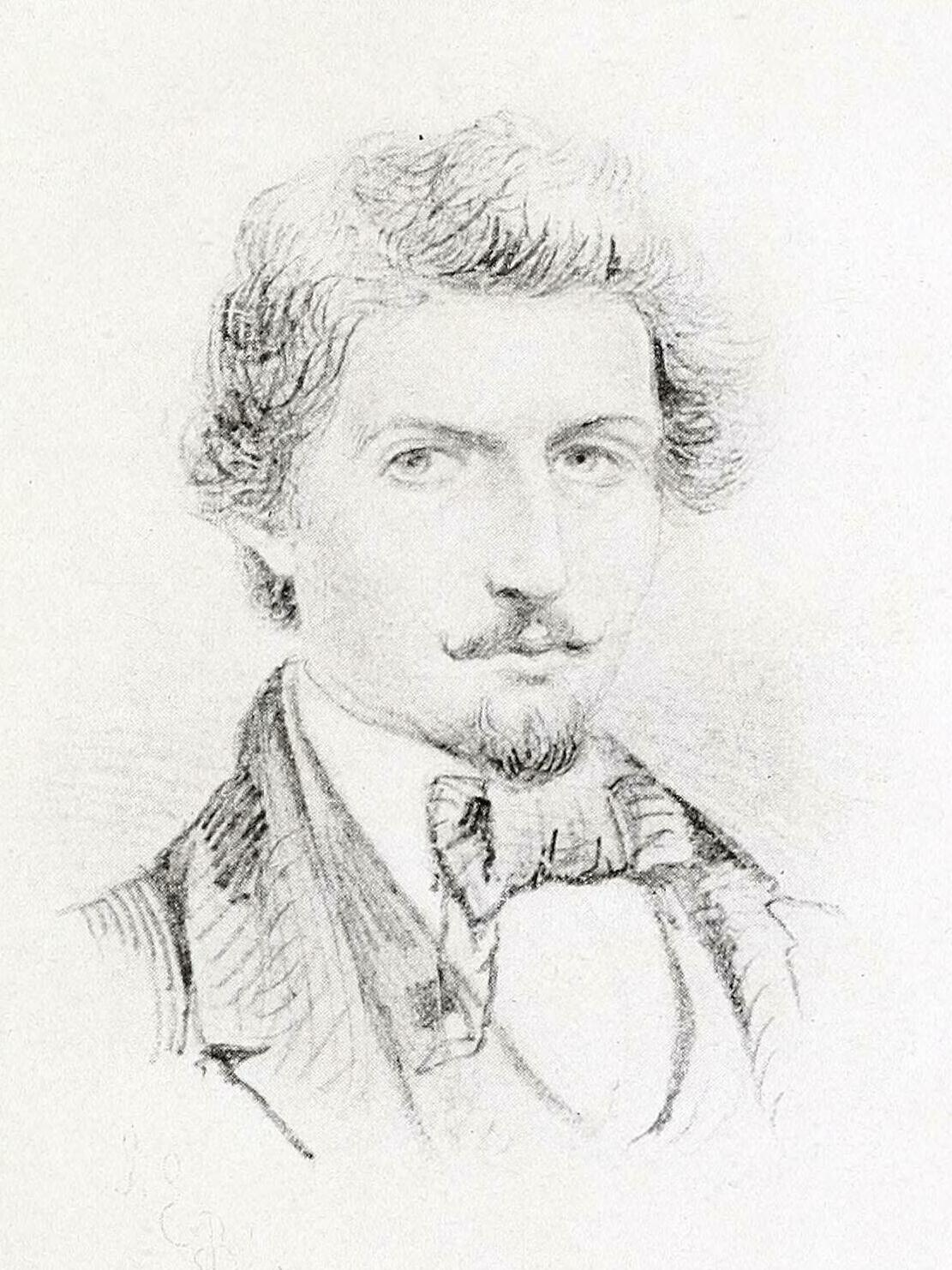
Winslow Homer in 1857

Artist Winslow Homer (1836–1910) has been called America's greatest painter. He was the son of William Flagg Homer's youngest brother Charles Savage Homer (1809–1898). Charles was a less successful businessman, who lost money in the California gold rush, and Winslow spent much of his first two decades, and many later summers, visiting while living nearby in a modest rented farmhouse. A Cladrastis kentukea tree, sometimes called Yellowwood or Yellow wood, that Winslow planted there grew to be a National Champion Tree in the 1990s, until being later removed. His artwork The New Town of Belmont was created on the day of Belmont's incorporation. The War — Making Havelocks for the Volunteers, 1861, is set in the Homer House parlor, and depicts upper-class young women sewing cloth neck covers for Union soldiers during the first two months of the American Civil War. Others of his artworks set in and around Homer House include Croquet Scene, What Shall We Do Next?, and The Robin's Note.

After William Flagg Homer's death in 1883, the house was sold to neighbor Susan Blake for $21,000. The Homers and Stowe are buried in Mount Auburn Cemetery.

Works by Winslow Homer in and around Homer House

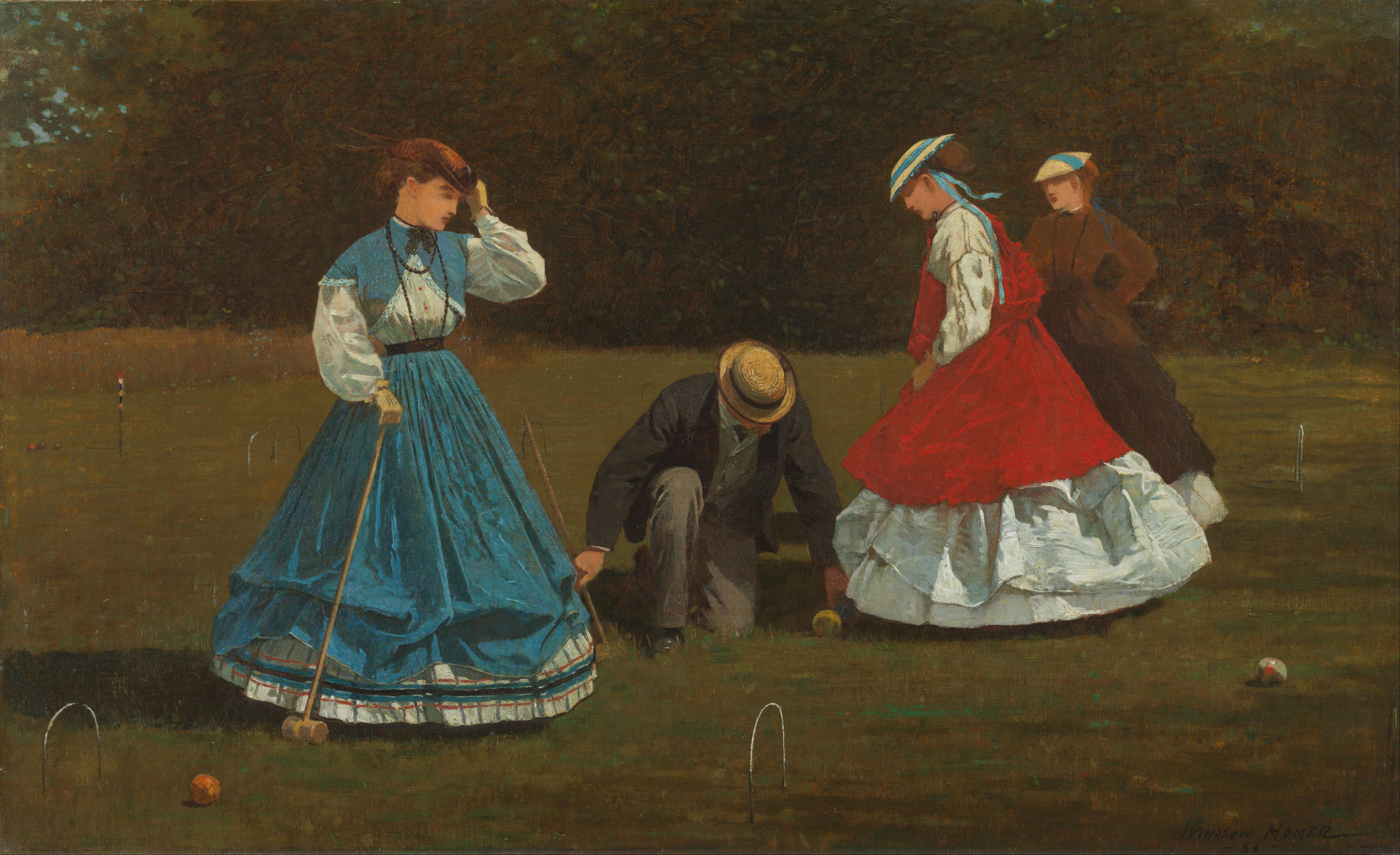
Croquet Scene, 1866

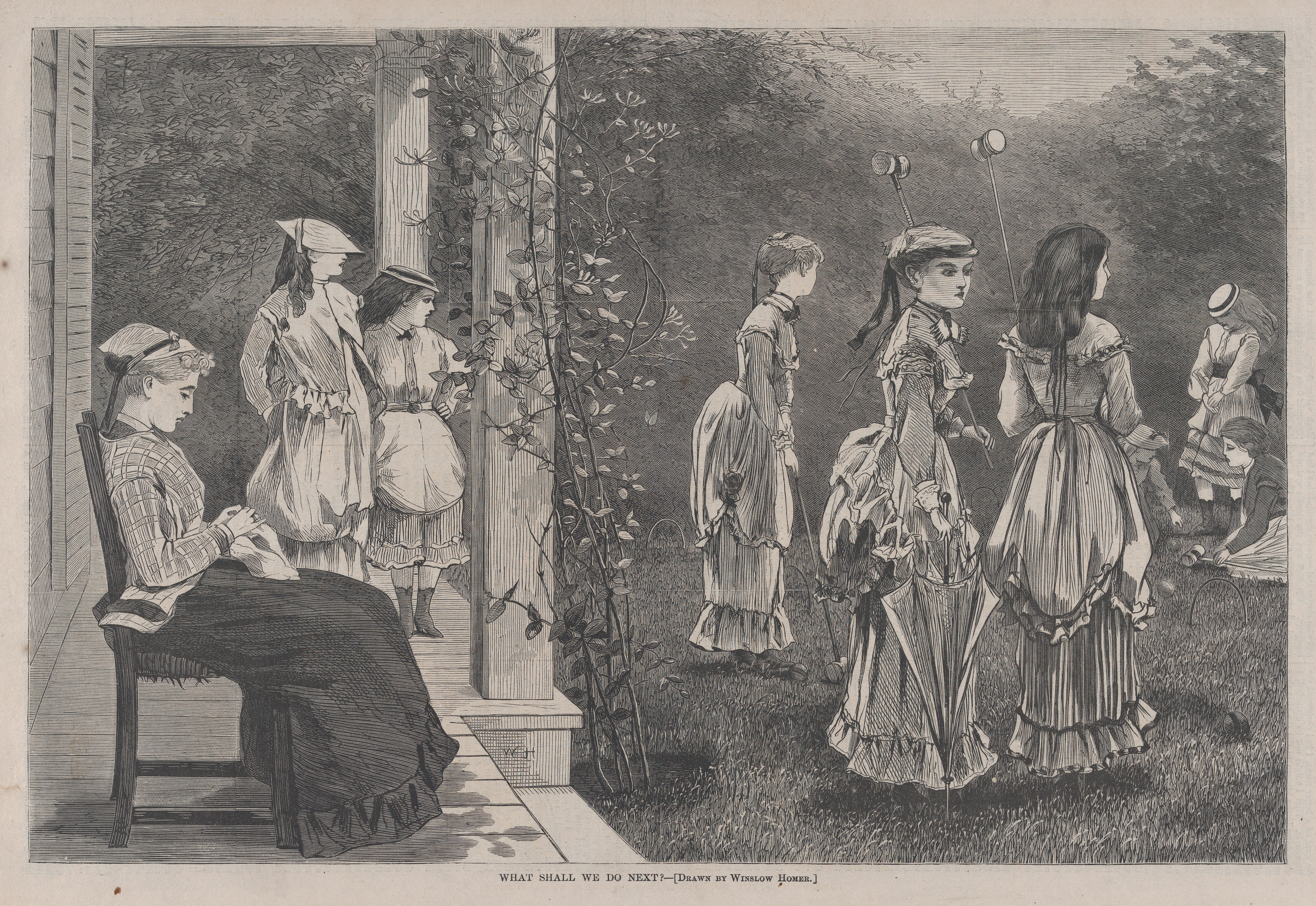
What Shall We Do Next?, 1869

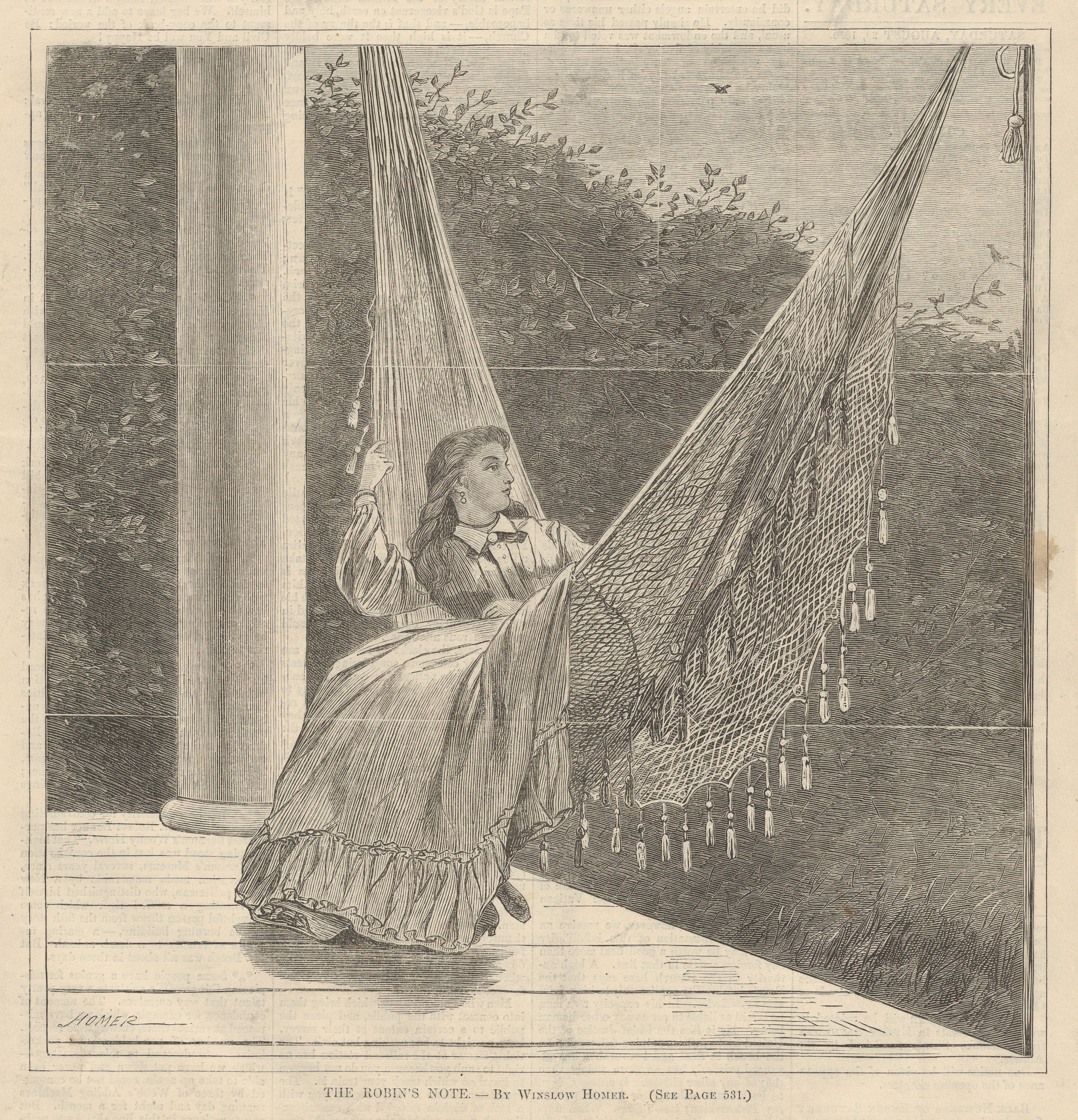
The Robin's Note, 1870

== Belmont Woman's Club ==
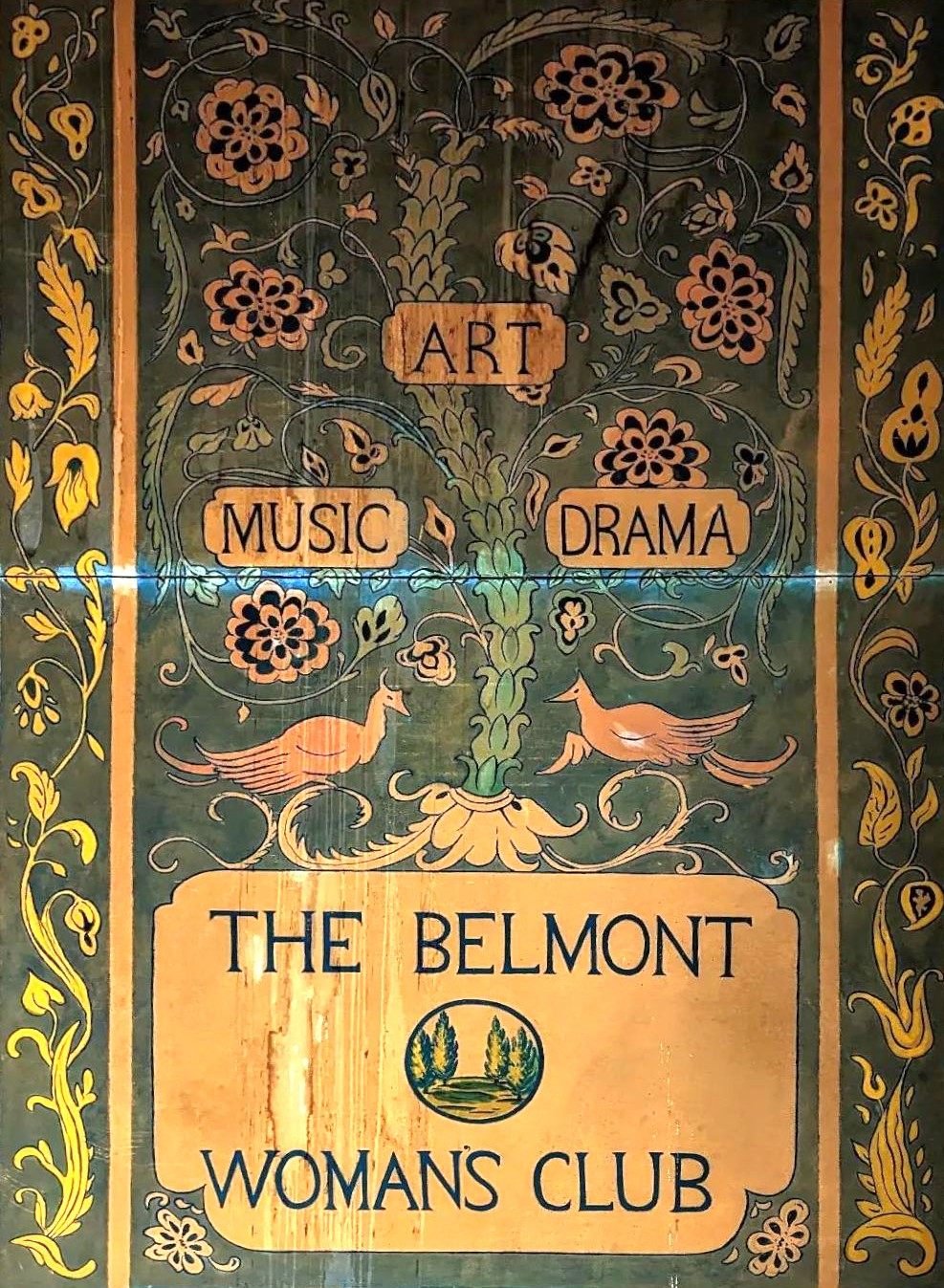
1920s Poster at the Belmont Woman's Club

The Belmont Woman's Club held its first meeting on February 11, 1920, with a membership of 400 "including all the prominent women in Belmont", according to the Boston Globe. It was part of the popular woman's club movement in the United States of the time, which played a large part in achieving women's suffrage in the United States in the year of the club's founding. The Belmont Woman's Club hosted classes in civics, parliamentary law, and drama, as well as sponsoring book discussions, philanthropy, and arts and crafts. By 1926, the club had 600 members and a waiting list of 100 more, all women from the town of Belmont. Mrs. Carl L. Schrader, an early president of the club, became president of the Massachusetts State Federation of Women's Clubs in 1930, then chairman of fine arts in the General Federation of Women's Clubs, in which positions she traveled the country, giving talks and assisting local committees.

The club bought Homer House in 1927 to save it from demolition, for a short time calling it Blake House, believing the woman who bought it after Homer to have been its first owner. It has used it as its headquarters ever since, hosting lectures and community events.

The modern Belmont Woman's Club is a 501(c)(3) nonprofit organization, open to all persons. Its male and female members act as stewards of Homer House, among diverse activities such as scholarships for high school seniors, and a 1993 gala concert in honor of Belmont resident Masako Owada's marriage to the crown prince of Japan. It continues to hold a regular speaker series, often in Homer House, and open to the public. It also hosts the annual Belmont strawberry festival, first held in 1859, the year of Belmont's founding, now serving as a commemoration of when Belmont was a town of farms.

=== Stewardship of Homer House ===
In 1979 the Woman's Club worked to have the Belmont Pleasant Street Historic District listed on the National Register of Historic Places. Homer House was pointed out as particularly prominent or outstanding within the district. In 2010, the approximately 54,854 square feet (5,096.1 m^{2}) of land around the house were donated to the Belmont Land Trust, to be held under a conservation restriction which prevents future development.

In May 2013, the Belmont Woman's Club began weekly tours of the Homer House, including inviting visitors to a turn at croquet on the front lawn, where Winslow Homer sourced his croquet-themed 1860s paintings. In 2015, the This Old House television program filmed an episode at the Homer House, exploring its plumbing and cupola, used for the equivalent of air conditioning. In 2016, the Homer House and grounds served as the first of several annual "Literacy on the lawn" events for children in honor of Beatrix Potter's birthday, with readings, painting, croquet, and a petting zoo. The 2019 event celebrated Dr. Seuss.

In 2017, William Flagg Homer House was selected as the site of the Junior League of Boston annual designer show house. Twenty rooms and spaces on the first and second floors were renovated, each by different teams of local designers, as a temporary museum of interior design, to benefit the Junior League's charitable programs for Boston area women and at-risk girls. The library was transformed into a Wunderkammer or cabinet of curiosities, the kitchen kept the antique stove but added modern appliances, while the bedroom became "an ode" to Princess Charlotte. After the October–November exhibition, the designers' furniture was removed but the wall coverings, including restored lincrusta, paint, and modern kitchen appliances remained. A Woman's Club fundraiser during the event raised money for a handicapped accessible bathroom on the first floor, which was installed in 2018. An earlier Homer House designers' showhouse, in October 1995, was not associated with the Junior League.

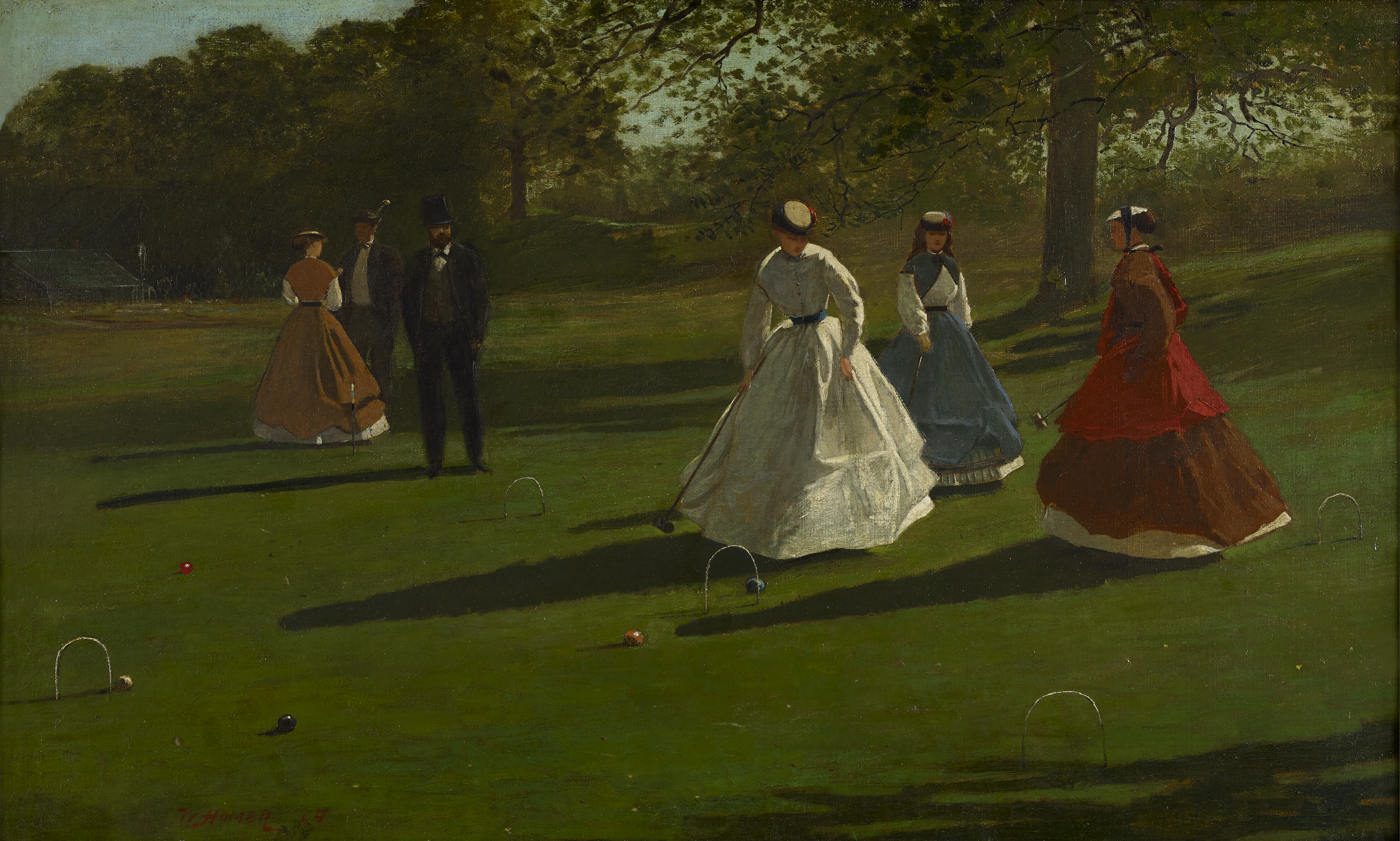
Croquet Players, 1865, Winslow Homer

The grounds of the house have been the site of multiple hands-on projects by local residents. In 1995, when the grounds of the house had fallen into disrepair, a project led by the local Boy Scout troop cleared away brush. In 2000, Belmont school children searched the Homer House grounds to gather seed cones from two copper beeches that Winslow Homer depicted in his 1865 Croquet Players painting, for preservation in a Florida nursery for famous trees. In 2012 one of the two famous beeches, suffering from a hazardous crack, was cut down. By 2014 the club had replaced the copper beeches with new ones. In 2020, 18 Belmont High School and Middle School students helped Woman's Club members and other adult volunteers landscape the Homer House grounds, removing invasive plants and replacing them with donated native ones.

As an old building, Homer House needs continuous funds to preserve and restore it. In August 2013, Homer House received one of the first grants of Belmont money from the Community Preservation Act, $10,000 to an architect and a consulting engineer with Belmont ties for a detailed conditions assessment and treatment plan. In 2014, the Belmont Savings Bank Foundation provided a $2,000 grant to restore the Homer House cupola, which had been damaged by winter weather to be unsafe for weekly visitors. In 2014 and 2015, the Belmont Woman's Club hosted fashion shows of local celebrities to benefit Homer House. In 2019, and again in 2024, the Belmont Woman's Club hosted a Dancing with the Belmont Stars competition fundraiser for the Homer House. The 2019 contest included local celebrities Will Brownsberger, Candy O'Terry, Becca Pizzi, Jimmy Tingle, and Marian T. Ryan, and raised $12,000. The 2024 contest raised over $25,000.
