= Belmont High School (Massachusetts) =

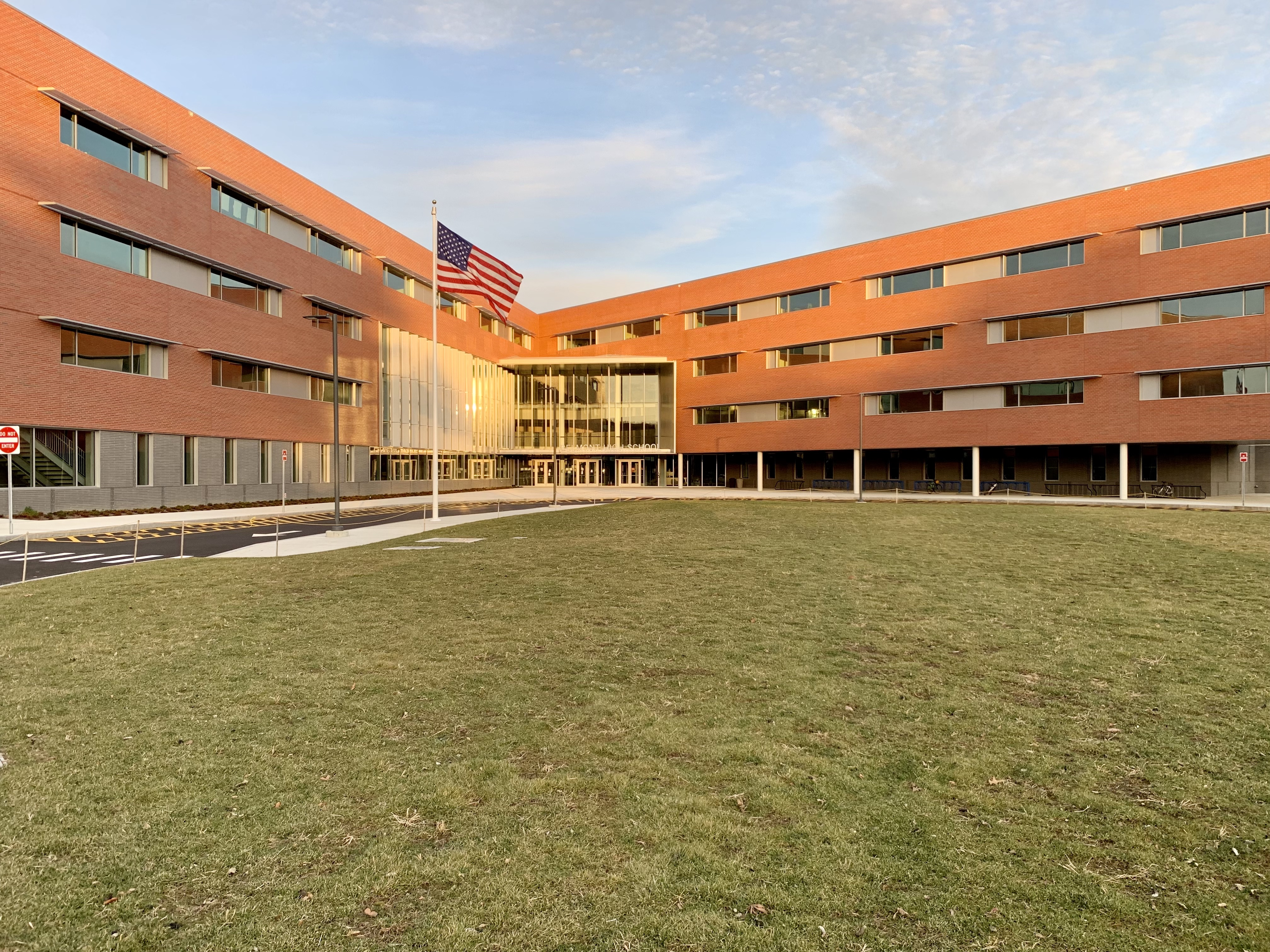
- Main Entrance

Location
- 221 Concord Avenue; Belmont, MA 02478; United States; 42°23′42.5″N 71°9′53.6″W

Information
- School type: Public
- Established: 1865; 161 years ago (OS), 2021; 5 years ago (NS)
- Status: Open
- School district: Belmont Public Schools
- Superintendent: Jill Geiser
- Principal: Isaac Taylor
- Teaching staff: 92.1 (on an FTE basis)
- Grades: 9-12
- Enrollment: 1,454 (2024–25)
- Student to teacher ratio: 15.8∶1 (on an FTE basis) (Note: The general page says 17.8:1, but the teachers page displays the correct ratio, 15.8:1.)
- Colors: Maroon and Blue
- Athletics conference: Massachusetts Interscholastic Athletic Association
- Nickname: Marauders
- Newspaper: Highpoint
- Website: www.belmont.k12.ma.us/o/bhs

Belmont High School is a four-year public high school in Belmont, Massachusetts, United States. It had 1,454 students enrolled and a student/teacher ratio of 15.8:1 in the 2024–2025 school year.

== Buildings and facilities ==
Construction of the current Belmont Middle and High School began in 2019. The high school building was completed in September 2021 for the 2021–2022 school year. As of 2022 it was the largest building in Massachusetts utilizing geothermal for heating and cooling. Located next to Clay Pit Pond, it is on the same site as the previous school, built in 1970 but now demolished. Prior to that the high school was located on Orchard Street, and was badly damaged by fire in 1967.

On September 7, 2023, Skanska, the construction firm working on the school, announced the renovation of the Belmont Middle and High School was completed. The new school spans 451,000 square feet and costed $256 million to build. The school is completely fossil fuel-free, as 283 geothermal wells heat and cool the entire building. The school also has solar panels on the roof which provide one-third of the property's energy.

On March 5, 2025, Belmont Middle and High School received gold certification from LEED, scoring 63 points.

== Administration and faculty ==
The principal is Isaac Taylor, appointed in 2019.

In 2004, the school's long-time principal, Foster Wright, retired. Jonathan Landman was hired to replace him, but the school department did not renew Landman's contract for the 2006–2007 school year. Michael Harvey was selected as an interim principal for the 2006–2007 school year. He had been the director of social studies during the previous school year. In 2012, when Harvey left to become superintendent of the Hamilton-Wenham schools, former-assistant-principal Dan Richards took his place. Richards had spent his last year as the principal of Melrose High School. On February 5, 2018, Richards announced he would be stepping down from his role as principal, with his last day being June 30. He stepped down to become the principal of the Georgetown Middle High School. For the 2018–2019 school year, assistant principal Thomas L. Brow was appointed as the interim principal of the school. On February 5, 2019, it was announced that the current principal, Isaac Taylor, accepted his position. He officially started his work on July 1, 2019.

== Academics ==
Belmont High School requires that all students complete:

- 4 years of English
- 4 years of Mathematics
- 4 years of Science
- 3 years of Social Studies
- 2 years of World Language
- 1 year of Fine and Performing Arts
- 4 years of Physical Education and Health
- 40 hours of Community Service

A number of Advanced Placement (AP), or college-level classes, are offered to prepare the students for the annual AP exams.

The school has nine academic departments: English, Mathematics, Physical Education, Science and Technology, Social Studies, Special Education, Visual and Performing Arts, World Languages, and Integrated Studies. The school also has an English Language Learners department. The Guidance Department is responsible for the mental well-being of students, schedule composition, and future planning. Each student is assigned to a guidance counselor.

=== English ===
All students are required to take an English course each year. Based on grade, the student may take English 9, English 10, English 11, and either English 12 or AP English Literature. English 9-12 are offered at college preparatory (CP) or honors (H) levels.

=== Social Studies ===
All students are required to take World History, American Studies, and Modern World History, all of which are offered at either a CP or H level. Students can replace American Studies with AP United States History, and can also replace Modern World History with AP World History: Modern. Electives such as AP Economics, You and the Law, and Global Leadership are also offered to interested students. In addition, the Social Studies department also offers AP Psychology, which can be supplemented by a H-level Neurobiology elective (offered by the Science department).

=== Mathematics ===
All students are required to take a Math course each year. The school offers math courses ranging from Algebra 1 to AP Calculus BC. In addition, the Mathematics Department offers several electives, such as AP Statistics, which can be taken instead of an independent study for a student who took Calculus their junior year.

Algebra 1 and Geometry are offered at either a CP or H level. Algebra 2 and Precalculus are offered at the CP, honors 2, and honors 1 levels. Calculus is offered at three levels: one H class and two classes to prepare students for either the AP Calculus AB exam or the AP Calculus BC exam.

Students can choose to follow the standard Massachusetts "on grade level" pathway, which is Algebra 1 in 9th grade, Geometry in 10th grade, Algebra 2 in 11th grade, and Precalculus/AMDM/Math electives in 12th grade. In addition, the school offers acceleration options for students interested in taking harder courses. These options include taking Geometry in 9th grade, taking Algebra 2 in 9th grade, and taking Geometry concurrently with Algebra 2 in 10th grade.

=== Science ===
All students are required to take, in order, Physics, Chemistry, and Biology, all of which are offered as CP and H courses, and, in the case of Biology, AP in the first year. In addition, students must take at least one elective in their senior year. Potential electives include AP Chemistry, AP Biology, AP Physics 2, AP Environmental Science, (Disease, Forensics and Technology), Zoology, Science Ethics, and Neurobiology.

=== World Languages ===
Two years of World Language are required. Students may take courses in Mandarin Chinese, Spanish, French, or Latin. AP language classes are available, typically in students' senior year, and include AP Chinese, AP Spanish, AP French, and AP Latin.

=== Visual and Performing Arts ===
Belmont High School offers many Visual and Performing Arts courses. This includes choirs, the Jazz Ensemble, the Modern Band, the Wind Ensemble, the Symphonic Band, the Concert Orchestra, and the Chamber Orchestra. The ensembles have won state competitions. It offers classes in theater including multiple Acting courses and has a strong theater program in the form of an after school extra-curricular organization known as the Performing Arts Company (PAC). In addition, a vigorous AP Art program gives student artists an opportunity to develop their talents and study new techniques. Visual art courses include Drawing and Painting, 3D Art, Photography, Media Arts, and AP Studio Art. In order to be considered for the AP Studio Art class, students must submit a portfolio.

=== Physical Education ===
All students are required to take the half-year, one-semester Wellness class during their freshman year, which is both a traditional PE class and a health/sex-ed class. Additionally, students must take Positive Decision Making and Life Skills during their sophomore year, which is also a one-semester class. During their junior and senior years, students can take either Cooperative Games and Adventure Education or Lifetime Sport and Fitness, both one-semester classes, to fulfill their PE requirement. Students can also participate on an interscholastic athletic team to fulfill the requirement. Students in their senior year get an extra option to participate in Independent Study to fulfill the requirement.

== School demographics ==
According to Massachusetts Department of Elementary and Secondary Education annual statistics, for the 2024–2025 academic year, the demographic enrollment distributions for race, gender and grade level at Belmont High School (Massachusetts) are as follows:

Total number of enrolled students: 1,454
Total number of full-time equivalent educators: 92.1
Therefore, the student to teacher ratio for this school is 15.8:1

Enrollment by Race/Ethnicity (2024–2025)
Race	Enrolled Pupils*	% of District
African American	60	4.1%
Asian	337	23.2%
Hispanic	83	5.7%
Native American	1	0.1%
White	856	58.9%
Native Hawaiian, Pacific Islander	1	0.1%
Multi-Race, Non-Hispanic	113	7.8%
Total	1,454	100%

* Approximate number of enrolled pupils is calculated based on total number of students in district, multiplied by reported percentage, and rounded to nearest whole student.

Enrollment by gender (2024–2025)
Gender	Enrolled pupils	Percentage
Female	716	49.24%
Male	727	50%
Non-binary	11	0.76%
Total	1,454	100%

Enrollment by Grade
Grade	Pupils Enrolled	Percentage
9	329	22.63%
10	403	27.72%
11	370	25.45%
12	352	24.21%
SP*	0	0%
Total	1,454	100%

* SP = Special Education Beyond Grade 12

== Extracurricular activities and sports ==
=== Sports ===
Belmont High School is part of the Middlesex League and the Massachusetts Interscholastic Athletic Association.

The school colors are maroon and blue. The school mascot is the Marauder, which is a pirate.

The high school's athletic department offers 32 sports programs with 77 teams:

- Fall sports
  - Cheerleading (V, JV)
  - Cross country - boys, girls (V, JV)
  - Field hockey (V, JV, F)
  - Football (V, JV, F)
  - Golf (V)
  - Soccer - boys, girls (V, JV, F)
  - Swimming - girls (V, JV)
  - Volleyball - girls (V, JV, F)
- Winter sports
  - Basketball - boys, girls (V, JV, F)
  - Ice hockey - boys, girls (V, JV)
  - Skiing - boys, girls (V, JV)
  - Swimming - boys (V, JV)
  - Indoor track - boys, girls (V, JV)
  - Wrestling (V, JV)
  - Cheerleading (V)
- Spring sports
  - Baseball (V, JV, F)
  - Lacrosse - boys, girls (V, JV)
  - Rugby - boys, girls (V, JV, DEV)
  - Softball (V, JV, F)
  - Outdoor track - boys, girls (V, JV)
  - Tennis - boys, girls (V, JV)
  - Volleyball - boys
  - Ultimate Frisbee

In the spring of 2011, the Belmont Rugby Football Club (BRFC) won the Division 2 Massachusetts High School Rugby State championship, and won the Div. 1 championship in 2013. The team participated in the championship game for three consecutive years (2013–2015). Belmont High Girls Rugby won the first-ever state championship in the sport defeating Algonquin Regional High School, 17–14, on June 10, 2017. It is also the first time in the US a state interscholastic body sponsored a rugby title. On June 15, 2024, the Belmont Girls Varsity team won its sixth State MIAA Rugby Championship, defeating Weymouth High School Girls 80–0.

== Notable alumni ==
- Michael Bivins, singer, Bell Biv Devoe, New Edition
- John F. Bok, lawyer
- Emily Cook, US Olympian in 2002, 2006, and 2010
- Robbie Guertin, guitarist, tambourinist, Clap Your Hands Say Yeah
- Bob Hall (1970), two-time Boston Marathon wheelchair champion
- Christopher Loria, NASA astronaut
- Susan K. Martin (1959), librarian
- Masako Owada (1981), Empress of Japan
- Mike Palm, MLB pitcher
- Becca Pizzi, marathon runner
- Jean Rogers, actress who starred in the original Flash Gordon serials
- Patty Shea (1980), champion field hockey player and coach, member of the US Olympic team in 1988 and 1996
- Wilbur Wood, MLB pitcher
