= Pleasant Street Historic District (Belmont, Massachusetts) =

Historic district in Massachusetts, United States

- U.S. National Register of Historic Places
- U.S. Historic district
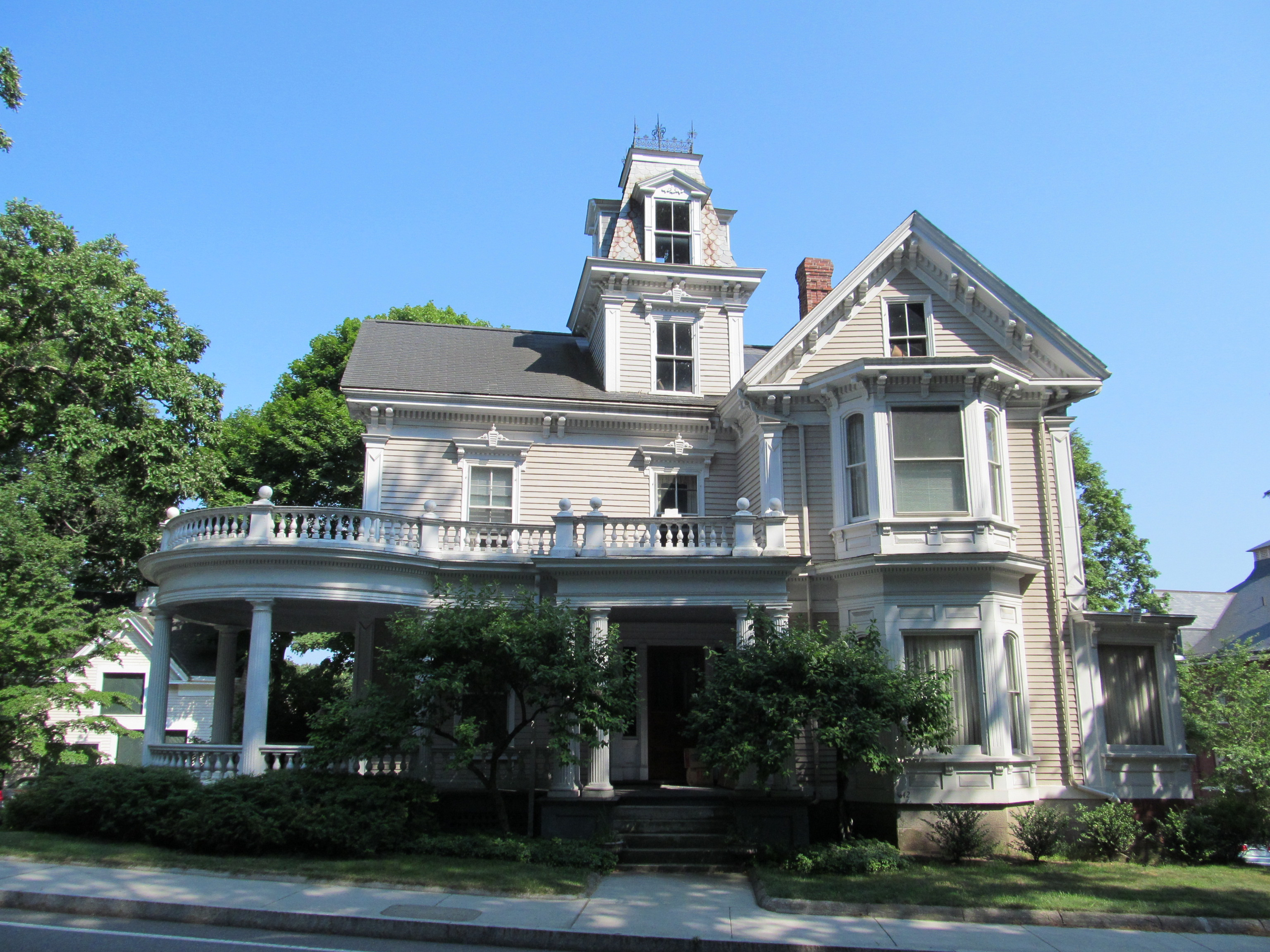

- Location within Massachusetts Location within the United States
- Location: Belmont, Massachusetts
- Coordinates: 42°23′54″N 71°10′36″W
- Architect: Multiple
- Architectural style: Mid 19th Century Revival, Late Victorian, Federal
- NRHP reference No.: 79000353
- Added to NRHP: June 12, 1979

The Pleasant Street Historic District is a historic district along Pleasant Street (Massachusetts Route 60) in Belmont, Massachusetts. The district extends along Pleasant Street, from Winn Street to just south of Concord Avenue in the south, and also includes properties on adjacent streets northwest of Pleasant Street. The area is characterized by mid- to late-19th-century single-family homes, generally on large lots, as well as Belmont's principal municipal buildings: its town hall and library.

The district was listed on the National Register of Historic Places in 1979.

== See also ==
- National Register of Historic Places listings in Middlesex County, Massachusetts
