= Clay Pit Pond =

Pond in Massachusetts, U.S.

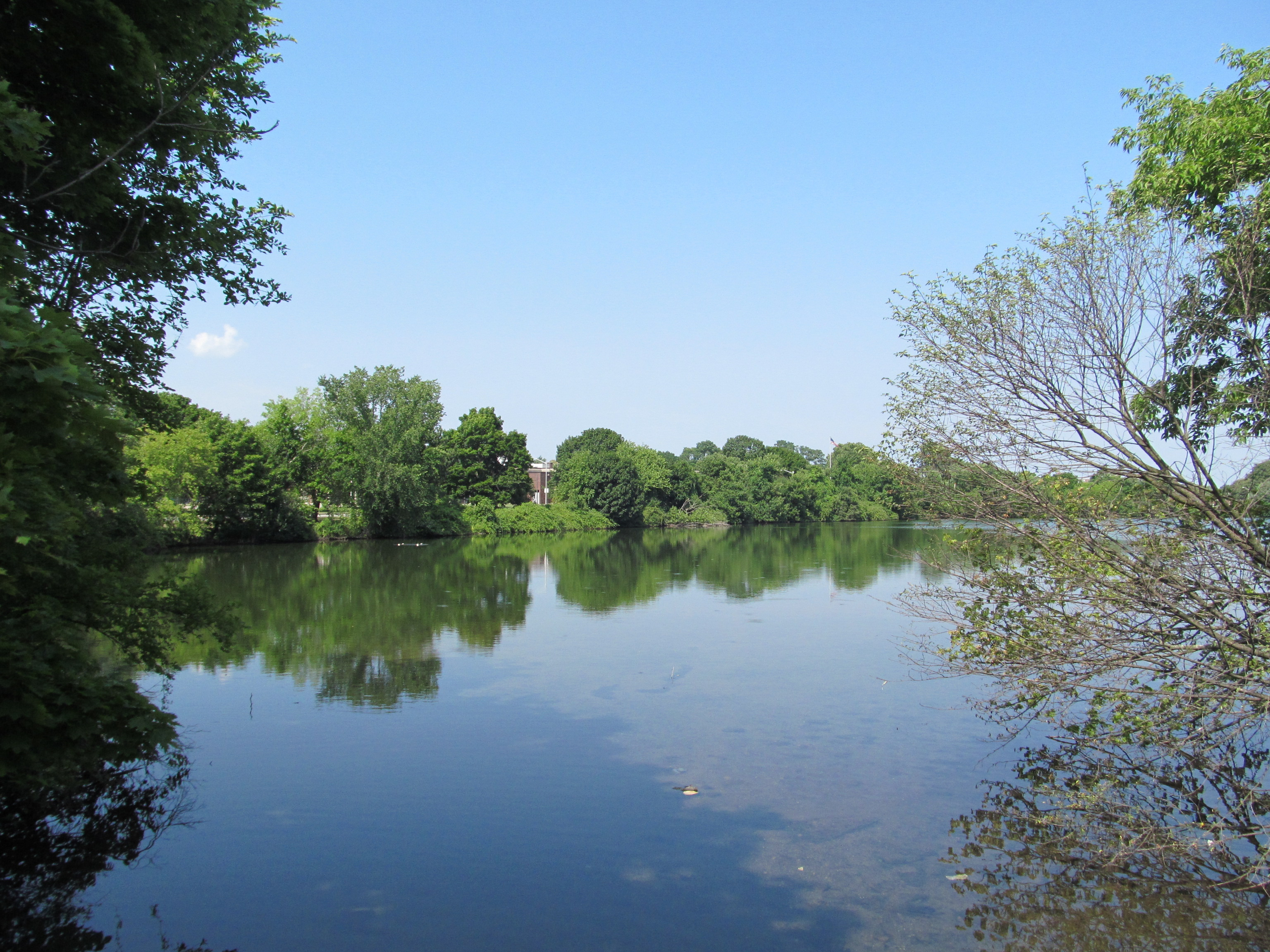
- Clay Pit Pond

- Location within Massachusetts Location within the United States
- Location: Belmont, Massachusetts
- Coordinates: 42°23′38″N 71°09′54″W
- Primary inflows: Wellington Brook culvert
- Primary outflows: Culvert to Blair Pond
- Basin countries: United States
- Islands: 1

Clay Pit Pond, also known as Claypit Pond, is a pond in the Boston suburb of Belmont in Middlesex County, Massachusetts situated between Concord Avenue and Belmont High School. It is a man-made pond, excavated as the source of clay for industrial brick-making on the site from 1888 to 1926. The pond was formed in 1933 when the Wellington Brook was redirected to flood the site, making it an essential part of the drainage system for much of Belmont.

The Parry Brothers first opened a brickyard in the vicinity of the current pond in 1888. In 1900, nearly all brick making operations in Middlesex County were merged into the New England Brick Company, which acquired the site and increased production to 15 million bricks per year with a work force of 75. By 1926, the highest quality clay was exhausted and the site was abandoned, reportedly leaving behind an 1884 Marion steam shovel at the bottom of the pit.

The pond is inhabited by bluegill, common carp, and largemouth bass, among other species.

The Town of Belmont purchased the abandoned pit in 1927 for $22,500 to use as a waste dump site. However, in 1933, the Town diverted the Wellington Brook through a culvert to flood the site with 80 million gallons of water, creating the Clay Pit Pond.

In March 2010, the pond overflowed onto the road after two days of rain, closing down the adjacent high school.

In September 2020, several Belmont citizens illegally removed more than 80 trees and shrubs from the south side of Clay Pit Pond. The unauthorized deforestation of this protected wetland area has raised environmental concerns.
