= Anne Corinne Colburn Ellison =

American lineage society founder

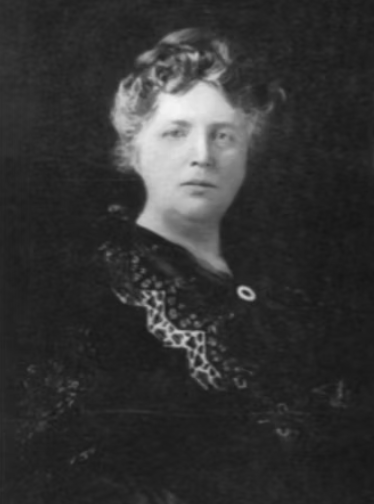

1st National President, Daughters of Colonial Wars
- Preceded by: office created

Massachusetts State Regent, Daughters of the American Revolution

Personal details
- Born: Anne Corinne Colburn Belmont, Massachusetts
- Died: January 8, 1946
- Spouse: Frank Dexter Ellison

Anne Corinne Colburn Ellison (died January 8, 1946), also known as Mrs. Frank Dexter Ellison, was an American civic leader who founded the National Society Daughters of Colonial Wars.

== Civic activities ==
Ellison was a member of the Daughters of the American Revolution and was featured in a 1920 edition of the organization's national publication. In 1918 and 1919, she served as the DAR's state regent of Massachusetts. In November 1918, she was received at a meeting of the Ausotennoog DAR Chapter in Lee, Massachusetts. She was a guest of honor at the 25th anniversary celebrations for the Hannah Winthrop DAR chapter in June 1919. In October 1919, she presided over the morning and afternoon sessions of the Massachusetts DAR's annual fall state conference at the Red Lion Inn and hosted DAR state regents from Connecticut, Maine, New York, and Rhode Island. In 1922, Ellison served as Librarian General. On May 16, 1922, she was a guest of honor at a tea party held to celebrate the retirement of the Hannah Winthrop DAR Chapter's board of management.

She founded the Daughters of Colonial Wars as a lineage society for women who descended from military or civic leaders during conflicts in Colonial America, including the French and Indian Wars and King Philip's War, on May 14, 1917, at the Hotel Brunswick in Boston, Massachusetts. The national society was officially incorporated on April 18, 1932 in Washington, D.C. She was elected as the society's first national president. On April 22, 1926, while serving as the Massachusetts State President of the Daughters of Colonial Wars, she organized an elaborate tea party in the ballroom of the Powhatan Hotel for members of the Daughters of Colonial Wars who were visiting Washington, D.C. to attend the Daughters of the American Revolution's annual national convention.

Ellison donated a mid-19th-century parasol to Historic New England.

== Personal life and death ==
Ellison was from Belmont, Massachusetts.

She died on January 8, 1946.
