= The Belmont Voice =

Independent nonprofit newspaper in Belmont, Massachusetts

- Type: Weekly newspaper
- Format: Tabloid
- Owner(s): The Belmont News Foundation, Inc.
- Founder(s): Community members and journalists
- Publisher: The Belmont News Foundation, Inc.
- Editor: Jesse Floyd
- Founded: June 2023
- Language: English
- Headquarters: Belmont, Massachusetts, U.S.
- Circulation: ~11,000 (weekly)
- Website: belmontvoice.org

The Belmont Voice is an independent, nonprofit newspaper serving the community of Belmont, Massachusetts. Launched in 2023, the publication offers a weekly print edition and a digital platform providing local news, features, and community information.

== History ==
The Belmont Voice was founded in 2023 in response to the decline of local news coverage after significant reductions in reporting at the town’s long-established newspaper. The newspaper’s founders, a group of Belmont residents and journalists, created the outlet to restore local, independent reporting in the community. Its formation occurred during a broader rise of nonprofit journalism in Massachusetts.

Coverage of the launch appeared in trade and regional media. Editor & Publisher profiled the newspaper as an example of community-driven newsroom rebuilding. Research from Northwestern University's Medill Local News Initiative included The Belmont Voice in an analysis of Massachusetts news-startup models. A 2025 report from New Hampshire PBS and the Granite State News Collaborative described it as a “well-funded startup” that addressed a local news gap by reintroducing weekly print distribution and local reporting.

== Ownership and funding ==
The publication is operated by the nonprofit organization The Belmont News Foundation, Inc., incorporated in April 2023 as a 501(c)(3). Its funding model combines charitable contributions and advertising revenue. According to reporting from Boston.com, the foundation raised roughly US$500,000 in startup grants and donations during its first year. Additional coverage from New Hampshire PBS in 2025 noted that the newspaper continued operating as a nonprofit supported by community fundraising efforts.

== Leadership and staffing ==
Jesse Floyd serves as editor-in-chief. Floyd previously spent nearly three decades with Community Newspaper Company/Gannett before helping launch The Belmont Voice. The newsroom is staffed by two journalists, freelance contributors, and a part-time advertising sales manager.

The foundation’s board of directors provides organizational oversight and guidance.

== Circulation and distribution ==
The Belmont Voice publishes a weekly print edition delivered free of charge to approximately 11,000 Belmont households and businesses. The newspaper also maintains an active website and offers a weekly newsletter, which had more than 2,300 subscribers by mid-2025.

== Content and coverage ==
The publication focuses on hyperlocal journalism, including coverage of town government, schools, local sports, arts, business, and community events. Its reporting addresses municipal issues, civic engagement, and topics of daily relevance to Belmont residents.

== Community engagement ==
The Belmont Voice encourages community participation through reader feedback, letters, and story suggestions. As a nonprofit, it offers local advertising opportunities and accepts individual donations to support its operations.

== See also ==
- Belmont, Massachusetts
- List of newspapers in Massachusetts
