= Belmont Public Schools =

School district in Massachusetts, United States

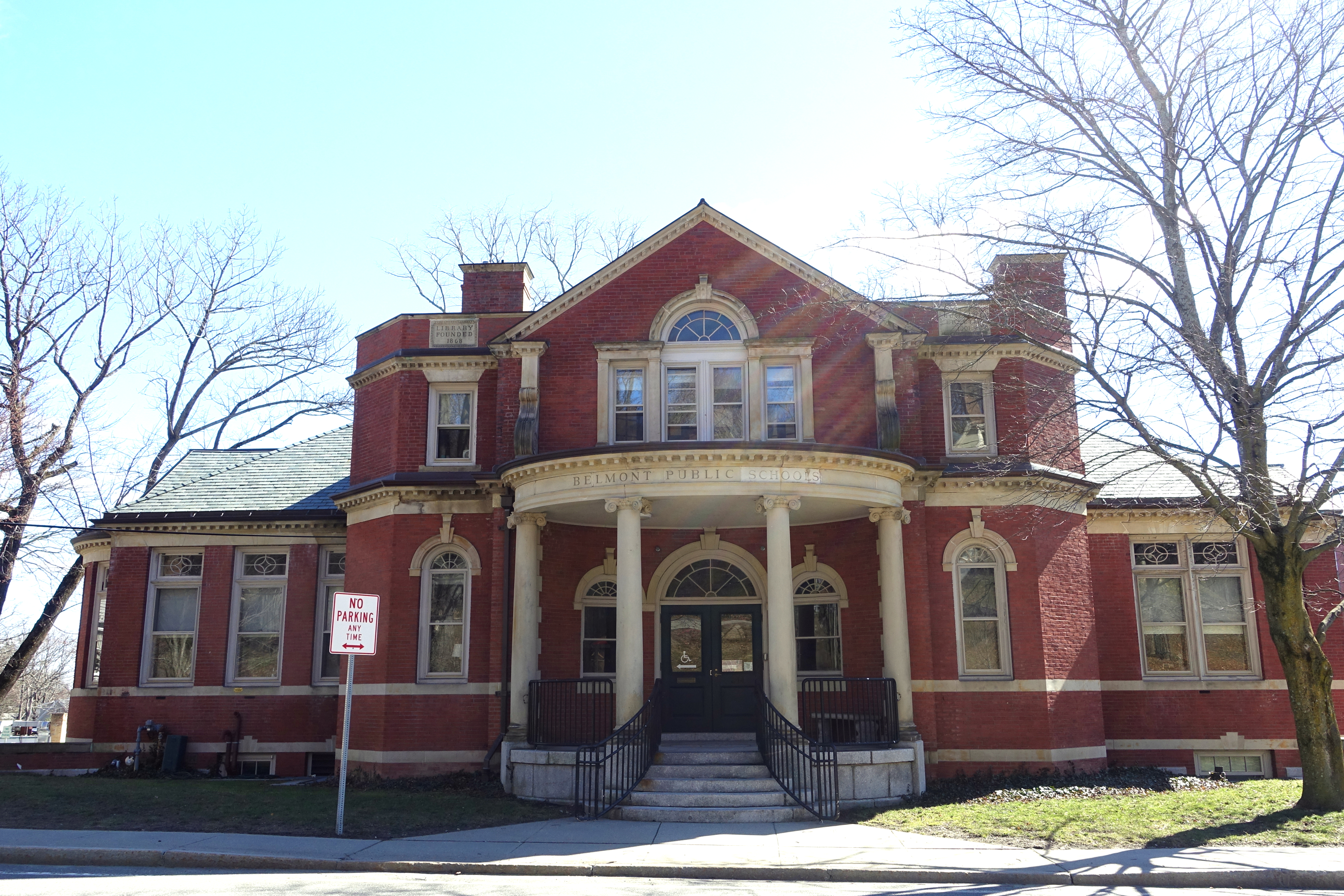
- The Underwood School Administration building entrance.

Address
- 644 Pleasant Street Greater Boston Belmont, Middlesex, Massachusetts, 02478

District information
- Grades: Pre-K–12
- Established: 1865
- Superintendent: Jill Geiser
- School board: Belmont School Committee
- Chair of the board: Meghan Moriarty
- Governing agency: Town of Belmont
- Schools: 7
- Budget: $88,463,818.86 (2023)
- NCES District ID: 2502490
- Affiliations: Foundation for Belmont Education, Belmont Education Association

Students and staff
- Students: 4,448
- Staff: 665

Other information
- Website: https://www.belmont.k12.ma.us/

Belmont Public Schools is a school district that serves Belmont, Massachusetts, United States. The district is highly regarded for the excellence of Belmont High School, the emphasis on the arts, and the quality of all-around education. The district also consistently scores above state average in reports of the Massachusetts Department of Elementary and Secondary Education (DESE).

== Schools ==
There are four public elementary schools in Belmont: the Burbank, Butler, Winn Brook, and Wellington schools. There is one public upper elementary school, the Winthrop Louis Chenery Upper Elementary School (Chenery Upper Elementary School). There is one public middle school, the Belmont Middle School, and one public high school, the Belmont High School. The middle and high school share one building, Belmont Middle and High School, which was finished in 2023 on the site of the former high school.

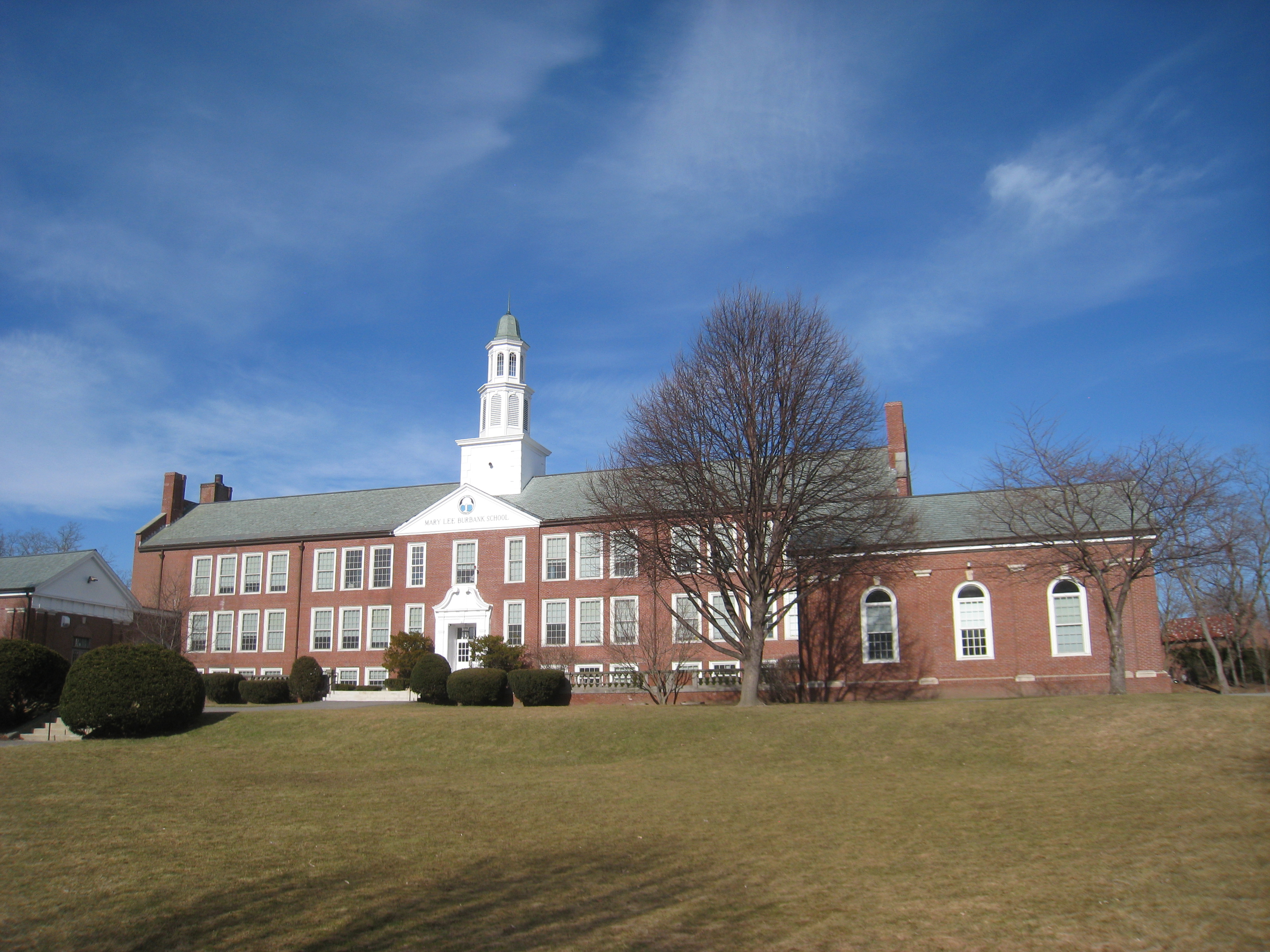
Burbank School.

The transition from elementary school to middle school in Belmont occurs from 6th to 7th grade, slightly later than in most communities. In the fall of 2024, the Belmont School Administration moved the 4th grade level to the Chenery Upper Elementary School, and made the elementary schools for grades K-3. This means the elementary schools are for grades K-3 and the upper elementary school is for grades 4-6. The middle school is for grades 7-8, and the high school is for grades 9-12.
