= National Society Daughters of Colonial Wars =

American lineage society

- Abbreviation: NSDCW
- Established: May 14, 1917; 109 years ago
- Founders: Anne Corinne Colburn Ellison
- Founded at: Boston, Massachusetts, U.S.
- Type: lineage society
- National President: J. Elaine Warmington Wagner
- Website: nsdcw.com

The National Society Daughters of Colonial Wars (often abbreviated as NSDCW) is a lineage society for women who descend from American colonists that lived between 1607 and 1775 and descend from a patriot of the American Revolution. The society aims to preserve colonial American history and promote patriotism.

== History ==
The National Society Daughters of Colonial Wars was organized by Anne Corinne Colburn Ellison on May 14, 1917, at the Hotel Brunswick in Boston. It was officially incorporated on May 27, 1921 with Ellison serving as the first president. The national society was officially organized in Washington, D.C. on April 18, 1932 and incorporated in New Jersey on November 22, 1935. The society promotes genealogical research, historic preservation, and patriotism.

The official flower of the national society is the Tudor rose and the official colors are red, white, and blue. The Tudor rose was chosen in honor of Elizabeth I, the last Tudor monarch, who the first English colony in North America was claimed for in 1584. The official insignia of the Daughters of Colonial Wars consists of a round disk with a gold laurel wreath, the Tudor rose in gold with five petals upon five petals, and the combined St. George's Cross and St. Andrew's Cross.

In 1940, the Daughters of Colonial Wars held its annual conference at The Claridge Hotel in Atlantic City, New Jersey, where fifteen of the twenty-one state societies compiled lineage books documenting 2,000 colonial ancestors. National officers and the presidents of thirteen state societies attended the conference.

The national society created the American Heroes Award to recognize individuals who show duty, courage, patriotism, and sacrifice for their home, community, and country.

== Notable members ==
- Karen Batchelor, lawyer and genealogist
- Ruth Coltrane Cannon, preservationist and historian
- Marion Moncure Duncan, lineage society leader
- Anne Corinne Colburn Ellison, founder and lineage society leader
- Sarah Corbin Robert, lineage society leader
- Kathryn Slaughter Wittichen, lineage society leader

== See also ==
- Continental Society Daughters of Indian Wars

== See also ==
- Daughters of the American Revolution
- Daughters of Founders and Patriots of America
- Daughters of the American Colonists
