= Stylianos Lenas =

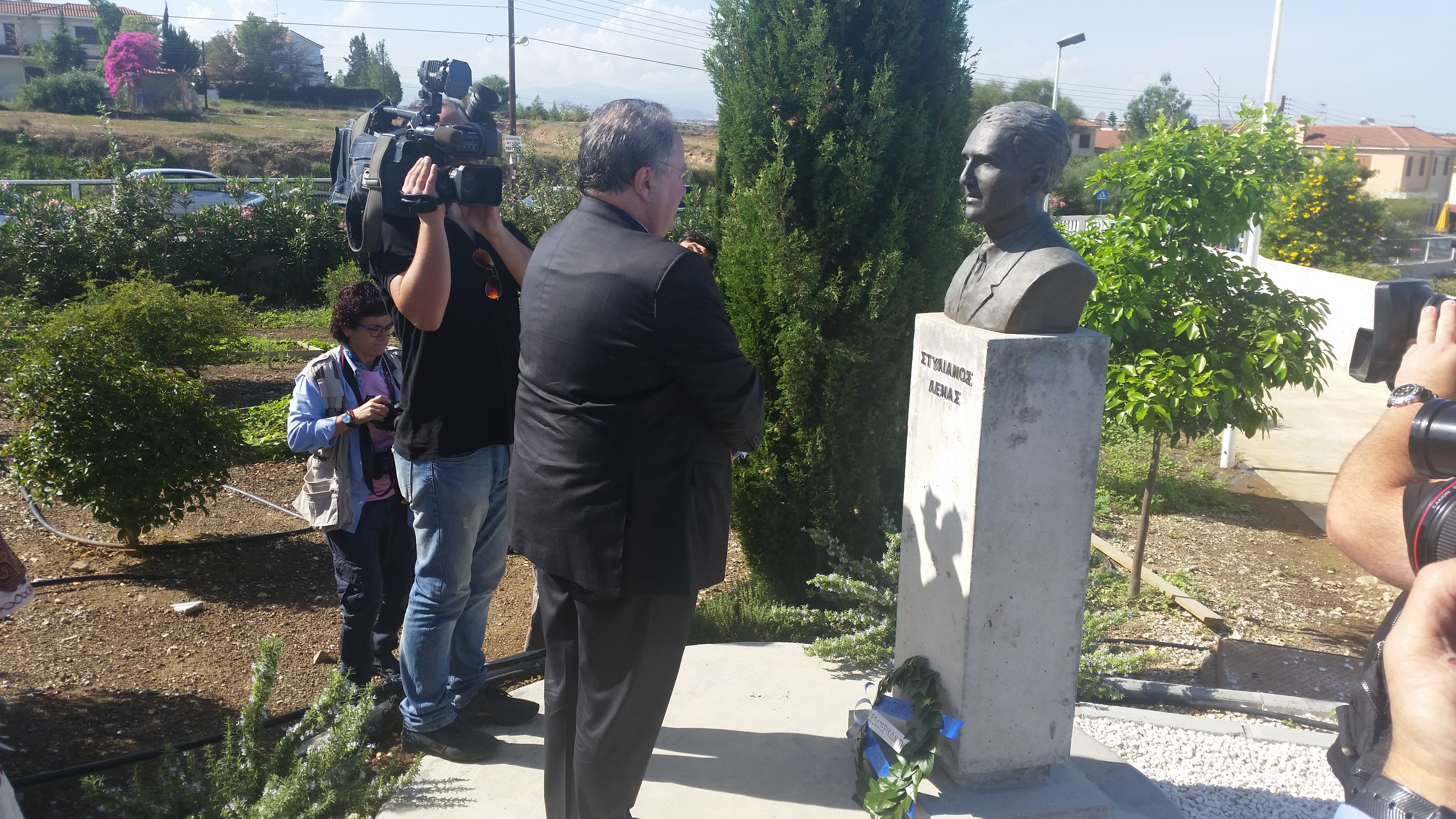
Foreign Minister of Greece Nikos Kotzias beside monument during his first official visit in Cyprus.

Stylianos Lenas (Greek: Στυλιανός Λένας; 20 June 1931 – 28 March 1957) was a member of EOKA, and one of the Cypriots who were wounded in battle against British soldiers.

== Early life ==
Lenas was born into a poor family in Chandria. When he finished the local school in his village, he took a job in town. He went to Lero for further studies and when he returned, he opened a shop and later worked as a plumber.

== EOKA activities ==
He was one of the first members to join EOKA and was located in the Troodos Mountains. Formerly a plumber, Lenas became a skilled maker of bombs and MK2 grenades.

Lenas was one of the first five squad leaders among EOKA units in Nicosia. He led his team during the 1 April attacks, alongside Markos Drakos, in blowing up the Wolsey Barracks and later trained sabotage units in Lysi. Lenas joined Grigoris Afxentiou when the latter took over as commander of the Pitsilia section; Lenas was appointed as commander of one of the four sub-sections in August 1956.

In a battle with the British Army in the area of Potamitissa on 17 February 1957, Lenas was seriously wounded and captured. He died in Akrotiri hospital after 39 days on 28 March 1957. He was buried at the Imprisoned Graves in the Central Jail of Nicosia alongside Drakos and Afxentiou; the British feared a publicly accessible grave would provoke demonstrations.

== Legacy ==
A motorcycle that belonged to Lenas and was used to carrying weapons and ammunition is on display at Cyprus Classic Motorcycle Museum.

== Bibliography ==
- Chirstophorou, Alexandros (2015). Stylianos Lenas: ho semnos kai tapeinos Gigantas tēs EOKA (in Greek). Athlētikos Syllogos Lenas Chandriōn. ISBN 9789963749713.
