= Operation Lucky Alphonse =

- Part of Cyprus Emergency
Date	7 June 1956 - 23 June 1956
Location	Troodos Mountains, Cyprus
Result	EOKA victory

Belligerents
EOKA	British Empire

Commanders and leaders
Georgios Grivas	Brigadier Geoffrey Baker

Units involved
Mountain Group	British Armed Forces; Royal Marines; The Parachute Regiment; The Gordon Highlanders; The King's Own Yorkshire Light Infantry; The South Staffordshire Regiment; The Royal Norfolk Regiment; The Royal Horse Guards; The RAF Regiment; HMS Diamond; C Company of the 1st Battalion, The Highland Light Infantry

Strength
50-100	5,000–20,000

Casualties and losses
	36

Operation Lucky Alphonse was a failed British Armed Forces operation that occurred during the EOKA insurgency in Cyprus. The British military sustained more than 30 casualties, mostly from an accidental forest fire.

== Background ==
Operation Lucky Alphonse was launched in the area of the Troodos Mountains in order to destroy bases in the area and also to find and capture or even eliminate the EOKA leader Georgios Grivas. It was the continuation of the previous "Operation pepperpot" which had led the British Armed Forces to capturing a few weapons and weakening three cells. Grivas, alongside EOKAs second in command, Grigoris Afxentiou, had previously escaped capture by the British in the Battle of Spilia, which took place in December 1955, making the British forces get entangled in a friendly fire incident which Britain took heavy casualties.

== Operation ==
The operation entailed multiple units of the armed forces in the Troodos mountains and at some point, Grivas was spotted, however, in the ensuing gunfight, Grivas managed to escape. A fire starting shortly after left 21 British dead and a further 15 with severe burns. The operation yielded a minor success with the seizure of some ammunition and documents, and the arrest of two individuals.

== See also ==
- Modern history of Cyprus
