= Raid on Lepka =

The Raid on Lepka
- Part of Cyprus Emergency
Date	April 1957
Location	Lepka Mountains, Cyprus
Result	British victory

Belligerents
United Kingdom; Suffolk Regiment	EOKA

Commanders and leaders
Unknown	Georghis Demetriou (POW)

Casualties and losses
Unknown	7 EOKA officers captured EOKA weapon stores confidscated

The Raid on Lepka took place in April 1957 as part of the Cyprus Emergency. British security forces attacked an EOKA guerrilla group in the mountains and captured seven leading EOKA officers including leader Georghis Demetriou and Mikkis Frillas.
