= Nicosia cinema bombing =

1955 terrorist incident in Cyprus

- Part of the Cyprus Emergency
Date	24 May 1955
Location	Nicosia, British Cyprus
Result	Assassination attempt fails

Belligerents
(United Kingdom)	EOKA

Commanders and leaders
Sir Robert Armitage (WIA)	Markos Drakos; Grigoris Afxentiou

The Nicosia cinema bombing took place on 24 May 1955. A cinema in Nicosia was bombed by the EOKA as part of an unsuccessful attempt to assassinate British governor Sir Robert Armitage. The bomb went off a few yards from where Armitage had been sitting a few minutes earlier; however by the time of the explosion most of the cinema had been vacated. The cinema had been screening the movie Forbidden Cargo on Empire Day as a fundraiser for the British Legion Fund.
