= Execution groups =

The execution groups (in Greek: Ομάδες εκτέλεσης) were a subdivision of the Ethniki Organosis Kyprion Agoniston (EOKA), the main anti-colonial organization in Cyprus. These groups, established in Cypriot cities by the organization's leader, Georgios Grivas, were central to his strategy of urban guerrilla warfare against the British, who occupied the island. During the Cypriot War of Independence, they participated in numerous assassinations and attacks targeting military personnel, police, spies, settlers, and traitors to the organization.

== History ==
=== Context ===
The situation on the island, then under British colonial rule, was explosive. As early as the 1930s, anti-colonial unrest broke out, notably with the 1931 Cyprus revolt, which resulted in the British reinforcing their military presence and surveillance apparatus on the island. The situation did not improve with the end of World War II, as Cyprus came no closer to independence. Georgios Grivas, who was then in Greece leading his anti-communist resistance group, X, was engaged in anti-Nazi and anti-communist activities supported by the British. However, after the end of the war and the Greek Civil War (1946–1949), he gradually adopted marked anti-colonial positions advocating for the independence of Cyprus from British rule and for its union with Greece, a concept known as Enosis. He arrived clandestinely in Cyprus in November 1954, with very limited support from Greek military circles, some officers, like Alexandros Papagos, being aware of his intention to launch the struggle but preferring not to get too involved and instead letting the situation develop. Quickly, Grivas established his paramilitary organization on the island, gathered explosives and weapons, and began to structure the new Ethniki Organosis Kyprion Agoniston (EOKA).

=== Creation and actions ===
Grivas established the first execution groups in the country during his time in hiding. After the launch of the Cypriot War of Independence by the EOKA on 1 April 1955, they began with some failures, primarily due to the inexperience of their members. The groups suffered losses but applied increasing pressure on the British by assassinating several police officers and government officials. This escalation in intensity continued throughout the island. The EOKA had particular advantages that other anti-colonial organizations of the same era did not possess, notably significant support within the Cypriot population, which allowed it to expand more widely across the territory and monitor the British. This also made it difficult for the British security apparatus to operate, as it faced a hostile population that was passing information to the EOKA. On 28 August 1955, in Nicosia, an execution group of three people, led by Michalis Karaolis, assassinated the spy Michael Poullis from the Special Branch in broad daylight by shooting him in the chest. According to Grivas, the spy had been warned by the organization to cease his activities on two occasions. Reflecting on the establishment of these groups, he stated:

We did not strike, like the bomber, at random. We shot only British servicemen who would have killed us if they could have fired first, and civilians who were traitors or intelligence agents. To shoot down your enemies in the street may be unprecedented, but I was looking for results, not precedents. [...] [I]n principle, there is no difference between mountain guerrilla attacks and street killings by the brave boys who formed our close-range execution teams. These young men, indeed, ran the greatest risk of all, and did not care who called them ‘thug’ or ‘coward’. They knew what they were fighting for. All war is cruel and the only way to win against superior forces is by ruse and trickery; you can no more afford to make a difference between striking in front or from behind than you can between employing rifles and howitzers.

These groups targeted numerous individuals, including military personnel, police officers, spies, settlers, and traitors to the organization. Grivas reportedly wished to establish one in London to target Cypriot collaborators who had been exfiltrated by the United Kingdom, but ultimately did not carry out his plan due to a lack of support from Makarios III.

== Legacy ==
The number of victims of these groups is difficult to estimate. Since Cyprus's independence, the fact that these groups were involved in extensive operations of targeted assassinations against other Cypriots is rarely mentioned in the country's official historiography, which is largely influenced by the perspective of the EOKA.

== Bibliography ==
* Grivas, George (1964). The Memoirs of General Grivas. Translated by Foley, Charles. Frederick A. Praeger, Inc.
- French, David (2015). Fighting EOKA: The British Counter-Insurgency Campaign on Cyprus, 1955-1959. Oxford: Oxford University Press (OUP). ISBN 978-0-19-104559-2.
