= Battle of Yialousa =

Battle of Yialoussa
- Part of Cyprus Emergency
Date	17 December 1955
Location	Yialousa, Cyprus
Result	EOKA victory

Belligerents
EOKA	British Empire

Commanders and leaders
Loizos Hadjiloizou	(British Empire) Lieutenant John kelly †

Strength
12	25

Casualties and losses
Unknown	Unknown

The Battle of Yialousa was a minor engagement on 17 December 1955. As part of the Cyprus Emergency, armed men of the EOKA took part in a series of attacks on police stations across Cyprus. The police station at Yialousa was attacked by 12 men resulting in the death of a British artillery officer, Lieutenant John Kelly.

Accounts vary on the aftermath of the attack. Andreas Varnavas' book claims the British troops at the station 'panicked' and failed to pursue, whereas other sources state that members of 40th Field Regiment, RA pursued and captured.
