= Evagoras Pallikarides =

Greek-Cypriot revolutionary (1938–1957)

- Ευαγόρας Παλληκαρίδης
- Born: 27 February 1938; Tsada, British Cyprus
- Died: 14 March 1957 (aged 19); Nicosia Prison, Nicosia, British Cyprus
- Cause of death: Execution by hanging
- Occupation: Poet

Evagoras Pallikarides (Greek: Ευαγόρας Παλληκαρίδης; 27 February 1938 – 14 March 1957) was a Greek-Cypriot poet and revolutionary who was a member of EOKA during the anticolonial 1955–1959 campaign against British rule in Cyprus. He was arrested on 18 December 1956 while transporting weaponry with his guerilla group, to which he confessed in his trial. He was sentenced to death by hanging, for firearms possession on 27 February 1957 and was the youngest fighter to be executed in Cyprus. His death generated widespread international condemnation due to his young age and the circumstances of his arrest.

Propaganda leaflets published and distributed after the hanging included a fabricated description of how he had murdered a traitor. The lawfulness of his execution has been subsequently questioned because the weapon he held at the time was not functional. In the A. W. B. Simpson book Human Rights and the End of Empire, Simpson claims that the real reason for Pallikarides' execution was that the authorities believed (but were unable to prove) that he had earlier murdered an individual who was a suspected collaborator with the British authorities.

== Biography ==
=== Early years ===
Evagoras Pallikarides was born in the village of Tsada in Paphos. He was the fourth and youngest child of the Pallikarides family of farmers.

=== Participation in the Elizabeth II Coronation revolts ===
In March and April 1953, during the preparations for Elizabeth II's coronation (due in June), Union Jack flags were raised in the city of Paphos. The locals were enraged and multiple protests were organized. These were mostly peaceful until in an April 1 protest in the school of Jacob 15-year old Evagoras climbed on the mast and took down the flag, tearing it along with his classmates. This kickstarted liberation riots along the entirety of Paphos, which were however ignored by the police by orders of the Governor who wished to avoid bloodshed in honor of the queen's coronation. Evagoras was arrested but subsequently released. During the period of celebration in June, no public celebrations took place in Paphos.

=== Participation in EOKA and second arrest ===
At the age of 17, Evagoras joined EOKA as a junior member. On November 17, 1955, he participated in a student riot intended as a distraction for an EOKA attack, which ultimately never took place. Evagoras was arrested and accused of organizing civil unrest, which he denied. The trial was postponed until December.

=== Third arrest and trial ===
On December 18, Evagoras and two other fighters were transporting weapons (a Bren machine gun and two caches of ammunition) for an impending attack, when they encountered a British patrol. The two fighters managed to escape but Evagoras was arrested. During the investigation it emerged that he had troubled authorities twice in the past, and he was formally accused of participating in EOKA and smuggling illegal ammunition. During his trial, on February 25, he confessed to his actions stating "I know you will sentence me to death, but whatever I did, I did as a Greek Cypriot who wants freedom."

=== Involvement of the Greek Government ===
The next day of the trial, the students of Paphos High School stayed away from their classes and asked Governor John Harding to pardon Evagoras. News reached the Greek government that immediately took diplomatic action to prevent Evagoras' execution. Representatives of the Greek Parliament telegraphed the House of Lords and the United Nations, while Greek citizens and Cyprus church committees requested the intervention of Queen Elizabeth II. American politician James G. Fulton was also involved in these attempts. However, Harding refused to pardon him.

=== Execution and burial ===
Evagoras was executed by hanging on March 14, 1957. British authorities buried him in the secluded prison graveyard of Nicosia "Φυλακισμένα Μνήματα" (Fylakismena Mnimata) to prevent his funeral from generating civil unrest.

== Legacy ==
Evagoras was the youngest and last EOKA insurgent to be executed by the British government during the Cyprus anticolonial struggle. His death continues to negatively influence Cyprus–United Kingdom relations, with some Cypriots blaming Elizabeth II for not halting Evagoras' execution. In 1993, Elizabeth II visited Cyprus, where protestors at the Famagusta Gate in Nicosia, waving Greek flags tied with black ribbons jeered her as she was presented with a key to the city. The football club Evagoras Paphos, established after Cyprus gained its independence in 1960, was named after him. It was later merged with another club to become AEP Paphos FC. The current iteration of the club, Pafos FC, features an image of Evagoras' face on the club's official badge.
