= Kyriakos Matsis =

Greek Cypriot guerrilla

Kyriakos Matsis (Κυριάκος Μάτσης) (23 January 1926 - 19 November 1958) was a Greek Cypriot guerrilla and member of EOKA (Ethniki Organosis Kyprion Agoniston).

== Early life ==
Matsis was born in Palaichori Morphou, Cyprus. He received his secondary education at the Famagusta gymnasium and, in 1946, enrolled at the University of Thessaloniki in Greece, from which he obtained his agricultural studies degree. During the years of the Greek Civil War, Matsis traveled in various Greek Army encampments to support the nationalist side. In 1948, he testified as a defence witness in the trial of Yannakis Drousiotis, a Cypriot communist captured by the Army, stating in court that the defendant's motives were "pure" and "not traitorous." Drousiotis was sentenced to death by firing squad but was eventually not executed and survived the war.

== EOKA ==
Matsis, along with his uncle George Matsis, joined EOKA in 1955, soon after the organisation was established by George Grivas, a Greek Cypriot Colonel of the Greek Army, and started armed operations against the British colonial authorities.

In 1956, Matsis was caught by the British and imprisoned at the Kokkinotrimithia prison. He managed to escape, and fled onto the Pendadactylos area, where he continued working for EOKA, taking up command of military operations in the Kyrenia region.

== Death ==
On 8 November 1958, a bomb exploded in a NAAFI canteen at Nicosia killing two British soldiers and injuring seven others. EOKA did not claim responsibility for the action. Nevertheless, the British authorities intensified their search for Grivas and the chief lieutenants of EOKA, focusing on intelligence from local sources. On 19 November, during a search by the security forces undertaken on the advice of an informer, Kyriakos Matsis along with two other EOKA guerillas were discovered staying at the house of Kyriakos Diakos, in Dikomo, near Kyrenia. Matsis destroyed all the papers and letters he was carrying and directed his comrades to surrender. After he was asked to surrender himself, he eventually responded that if he were to come out, he'd come out shooting. He was killed by a grenade in the gun battle that ensued.

His body was buried by the British authorities in the special yard, inside the Central Jail of Nicosia.

Subsequent to this operation, it was made clear by the Colonial Office that the military in Cyprus should "finish off the job" and find Grivas. John Profumo, the junior Office minister, oversaw a special executive order to speed up the flow of military material to the island. The village where Matsis was killed is now under the control of the internationally unrecognized Turkish-Cypriot administration.

== Family ==
His younger brother, Yiannakis Matsis (b.1933), was elected Member of the European Parliament with the group of the European People's Party, from 14 June 2004 until June 2009, when he did not seek re-election.

== See also ==
- Grigoris Afxentiou
