= Battle of Famagusta =

1955 military engagement during the Cyprus Emergency

- Part of Cyprus Emergency
Date	20–21 November 1955
Location	Famagusta, Cyprus
Result	EOKA victory

Belligerents
EOKA	British Empire

The Battle of Famagusta was a military engagement during the Cyprus Emergency. It involved a battle between British troops and members of EOKA.
