= Kyrenia Castle Escape =

- Part of Cyprus Emergency
Date	23 September 1955
Location	Kyrenia, Cyprus
Result	Nine EOKA prisoners escape

Belligerents
United Kingdom	EOKA

The Kyrenia Castle Escape took place early in the Cyprus Emergency. A number of the EOKA were being held prisoner at Kyrenia Castle and on 23 September 1955, sixteen of them escaped by climbing down sheets tied to be a rope.

The escapees were: Marcos Drakos, Christakis Eleftheriou, Evangelos Evangelakis, Mikis Fyrillas, Lambros Kafkallides, Constantinos Loizou, Pavlos Nikitas, Petros Papaioannou, Panayiotis Papanastasiou, Andreas Polyviou, Michalakis Rossides, Lefkios Rodosthenous, Stelios Siamisis, Petros Stylianou, Demos Vryonides, Charilaos Xenofontos.

Seven were caught but the other nine – Evangelakis, Xenofontos, Kafkalides, Drakos, Rodosthenous, Fyrillas, Polyviou, Eleftheriou, and Nikitas – joined EOKA guerrilla outfits. The incident was extremely embarrassing to the British government.

Evangelakis was recaptured in February 1957. Firillas was recaptured in April 1957.

== November Riot ==
On 13 November 1955 over 100 prisoners rioted at the castle.
