= Imprisoned Graves =

Coordinates: 35°10′49.51″N 33°20′37.28″E

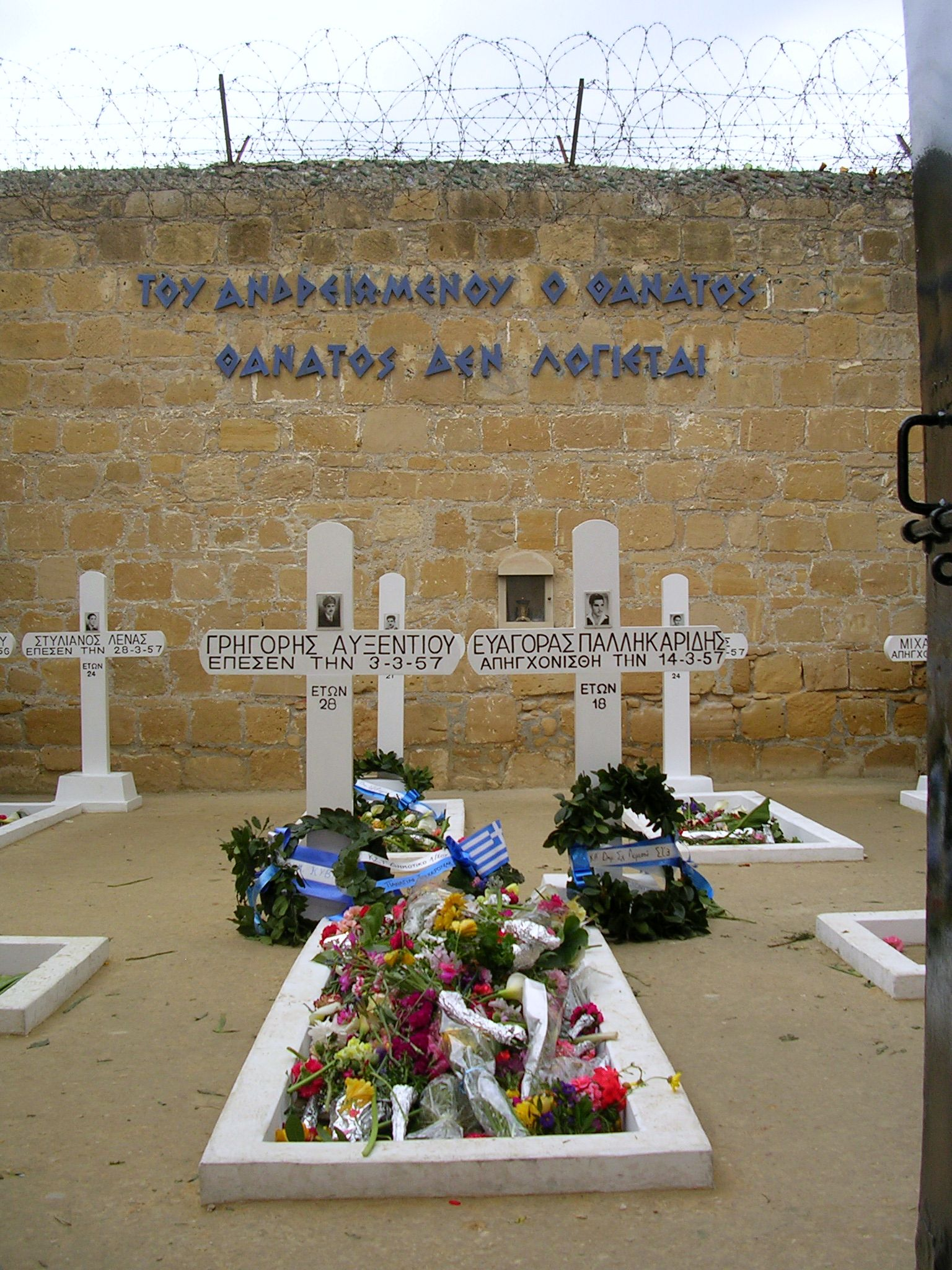
The Imprisoned Tombs

The "Imprisoned Graves" (Greek: «Φυλακισμένα Μνήματα», romanized: Filakisména Mnímata) are a set of graves in a small cemetery located in the Central Jail of Nicosia, where 13 EOKA fighters killed during the Cyprus Emergency were interred. Nine of them were hanged by British executioner Harry Allen, three were killed in action and one died in hospital from wounds he sustained.

The tombs were built in an area adjacent to the cells of the condemned and close to the gallows where they would be executed. The area is surrounded by tall walls and covered by glass.

Having a small, private cemetery was the idea of Cyprus Governor Sir John Harding, who did not want the funerals of EOKA fighters to be turned into demonstrations against British rule. The condemned, as well as the four others who died, would be buried in the area without any relatives or a priest present. The nine men who were hanged were buried immediately following their executions. To save space, they were buried two to a grave.

The nine men who are hanged on the gallows were:

- Michalis Karaolis - executed 10 May 1956
- Andreas Dimitriou - executed 10 May 1956
- Iakovos Patatsos - executed 9 August 1956
- Andreas Zakos - executed 9 August 1956
- Harilaos Michael - executed 9 August 1956
- Michail Koutsoftas - executed 21 September 1956
- Stelios Mavrommatis - executed 21 September 1956
- Andreas Panagidis - executed 21 September 1956
- Evagoras Pallikaridis - executed 14 March 1957

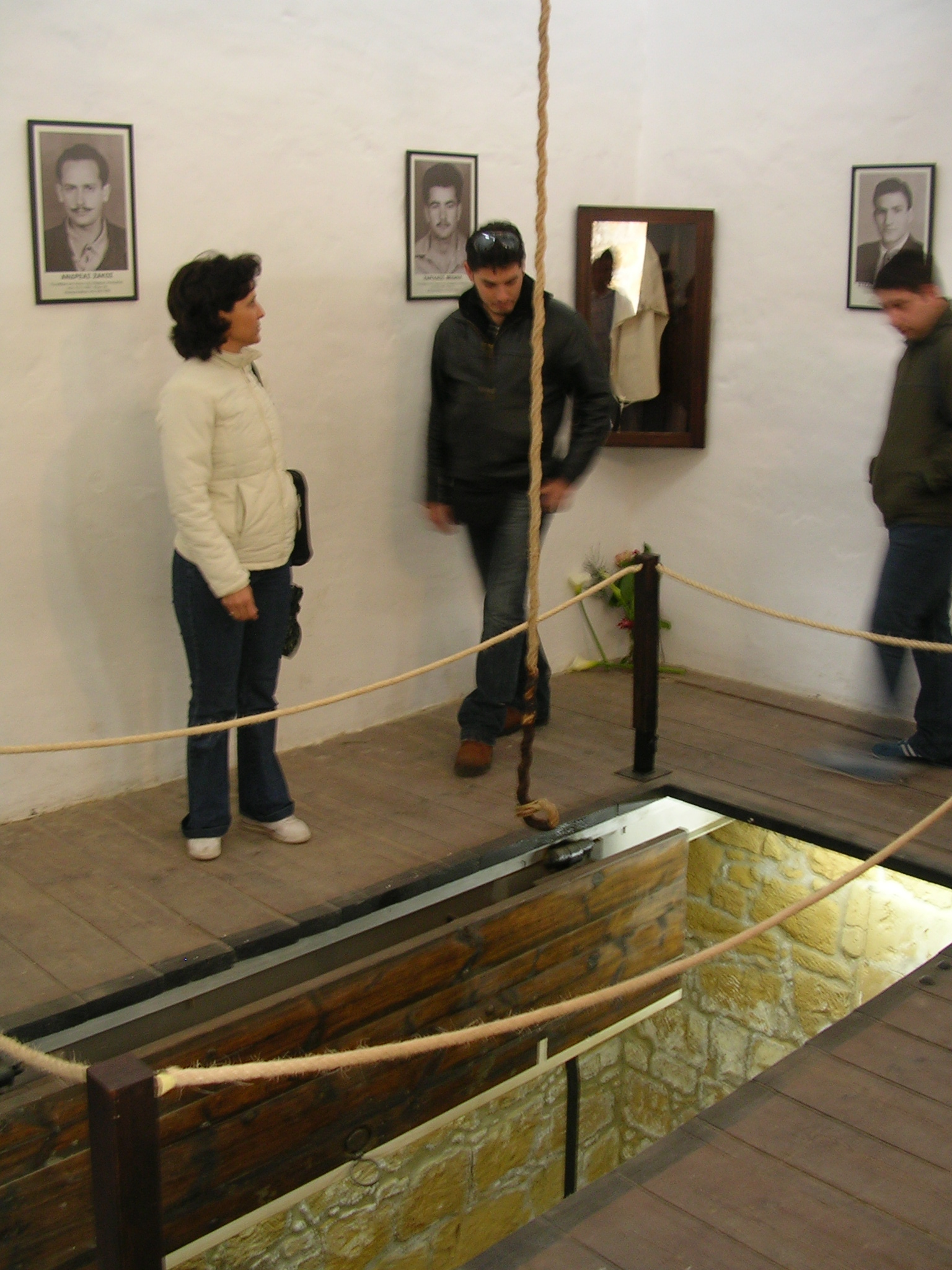
The gallows at Central Jail of Nicosia, today a museum.

The other four were:

- Markos Drakos
- Grigoris Afxentiou
- Stylianos Lenas
- Kyriakos Matsis

After Cyprus gained independence, the area became a national monument. A sign proclaiming "Του ανδρειωμένου ο θάνατος, θάνατος δεν λογιέται" - "The brave man's death is no death at all" was put up against one of the walls.

During the Turkish invasion of Cyprus (1974) battles raged around the Central Jail of Nicosia. Vastly outnumbered, the Cypriot national guardsmen - aided by corrections officers - managed to fight off the Turkish army and keep the jail with the Imprisoned Graves from being captured.

Today, the cemetery along with the cells and the gallows function as a museum, open every day between 8:30 and 13:30 for visitors. Taking photos and videos are allowed, but mobile telephones are not (because the museum resides within the territory of the Central Jail of Nicosia).

== See also ==
- Capital punishment in Cyprus
