= Battle of Spilia =

- Part of Cyprus Emergency
Date	11 or 12 December 1955
Location	Cyprus
Result	EOKA victory

Belligerents
EOKA	(United Kingdom) British Empire: British Armed Forces; Royal Marines; Parachute Regiment; Gordon Highlanders

Commanders and leaders
Georgios Grivas; Grigoris Afxentiou	(United Kingdom) Lieutenant colonel Norman Tailyour (United Kingdom) Major M.A.K. Steven

Units involved
George Grivas' group	45 Commando; 2 Companies from the Gordon Highlanders

Strength
12 EOKA	700

Casualties and losses
None	2-50 wounded

The Battle of Spilia is the name given to a battle in the Cyprus Emergency that took place in the neighbourhood of the Cypriot village of Spilia on either 11 or 12 December 1955. The engagement involved approximately 12 members of Georgios Grivas’s EOKA group and a 40 man detachment of the 45 Commando Royal Marines supported by the rest of the force intending to trap the insurgents. In British military sources this is known as part of a wider operation known as ‘Foxhunter’ that was tasked with breaking up the EOKA presence in the Troodos mountains and capturing EOKA leader Georgios Grivas.

Grivas’ memoirs describe the event as a disaster for the British in which a small band of EOKA fighters took on a large ambushing force of British soldiers. He claims that he heard after the fact that there were at least 50 casualties although British sources claim ‘two slightly wounded’. Grivas claims Lieutenant Colonel Tailyour was killed in action even though Tailyour went on to serve as Commandant General Royal Marines dying in 1979.

British sources state that a Greek man was arrested in the vicinity carrying a rifle and cordex fuses and gave Grivas’ location away during interrogation. A patrol then set off in search of the hideout. Grivas and his men managed to escape and Britain sustained multiple casualties. The engagement resulted in Grivas’s escape but with the cave destroyed.

Greek sources claim that during the battle British units from the north and ones from the south, unable to see in the fog and in the belief that they were surrounded by EOKA fighters, engaged each other in an eight-hour firefight involving airstrikes, artillery bombardments, and heavy weapons. This firefight caused 250 casualties, including 127 deaths, 102 injuries, and 21 missing, which, if true, would make it the deadliest friendly fire incident of the war.

== Legacy ==
The battle in Cyprus is highly regarded and one of the most notable events, with the Forestry department fixing the cave and the area around it and allowing for visits to the cave.
