= Markos Drakos (EOKA fighter) =

Cypriot guerilla fighter

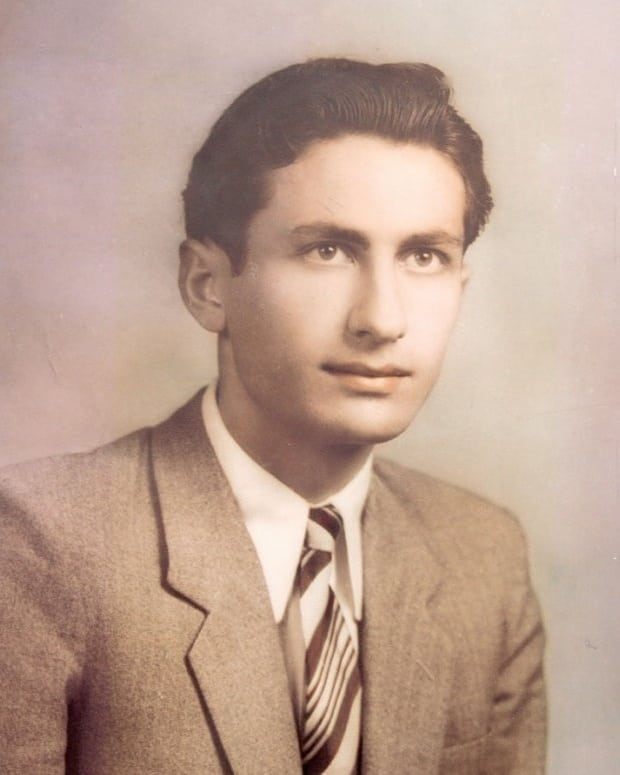
- Markos Drakos as a student
- Native name: Μάρκος Δράκος
- Nickname: Lykourgos (Λυκούργος)
- Born: 24 September 1932; Kalopanayiotis, British Cyprus
- Died: 18 January 1957 (aged 24) Solea Valley, British Cyprus
- Buried: Imprisoned Graves, Central Jail of Nicosia
- Allegiance: Kingdom of Greece
- Branch: EOKA
- Service years: 1955–1957
- Commands: Leader of the “Astrapi” team
- Conflicts: Cyprus Emergency: 1 April Attacks; Nicosia Cinema Bombing; Kyrenia Castle Escape
- Education: University of Cyprus
- Other work: Miner

Markos Drakos (Greek: Μάρκος Δράκος; 24 September 1932 – 18 January 1957) was a Greek Cypriot guerrilla fighter who was killed in the EOKA struggle (1955–1959) against the British. His nom de guerre was Lykourgos. He was born in Nicosia District, on 24 September 1932 and studied accounting. He worked for the Hellenic Mining Company in Cyprus until 1954. When EOKA was formed, Drakos was among the first to join, training others in the use of arms and recruiting members. Drakos was mild-mannered and enthusiastic to learn about military operations, as well as being devoutly religious, and EOKA commander Georgios Grivas "Dighenis" quickly took a liking to him. He saw great potential in Drakos as a leader, and he was quickly promoted to a senior position in EOKA.

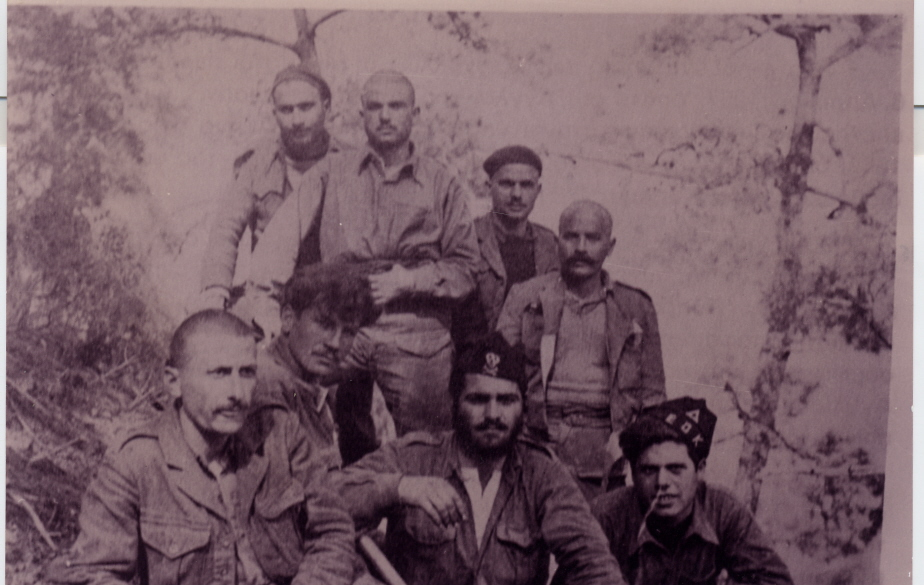
The fighting team of Markos Drakos, first seated on the left. Others in the photograph include Nikos Pastelopoulos, Andreas Gastriotis, Stelios Xapolitos, Nikos Psomas, Charalambos Efstathiou, and Mikis Fylilou.

On 1 April 1955, considered to be the first day of the struggle, Drakos and his "Astrape" ("Lightning") team blew up the radio station at Athalassa, destroying it completely. With his squad, he would go on to co-ordinate several other operations.

On 30 June 1955 Drakos was arrested by the British with 14 other EOKA members and imprisoned in Kyrenia Castle but managed to escape 3 months later, by tying blankets together and abseiling out of the windows. A bounty of £5,000 was placed on his head by the authorities.

On the night of 18 January 1957, British forces attacked Drakos and his men at their hideout in the Solea Valley. Drakos was killed and his body recovered and interred by the British in the Imprisoned Graves in the Central Jail of Nicosia.

Evrychou Community Council later erected a marble statue at the location in Sklinitzia where he fell. Dracos' sten gun was preserved and is currently on display at the Suffolk Regiment Museum.

In 1963, a statue of Drakos in Nicosia was bombed as part of the clashes between Greek Cypriots and Turkish Cypriots. It was soon restored.
