= Battle at Nicosia Hospital =

Battle during the Cyprus Emergency

- Part of the Cyprus Emergency
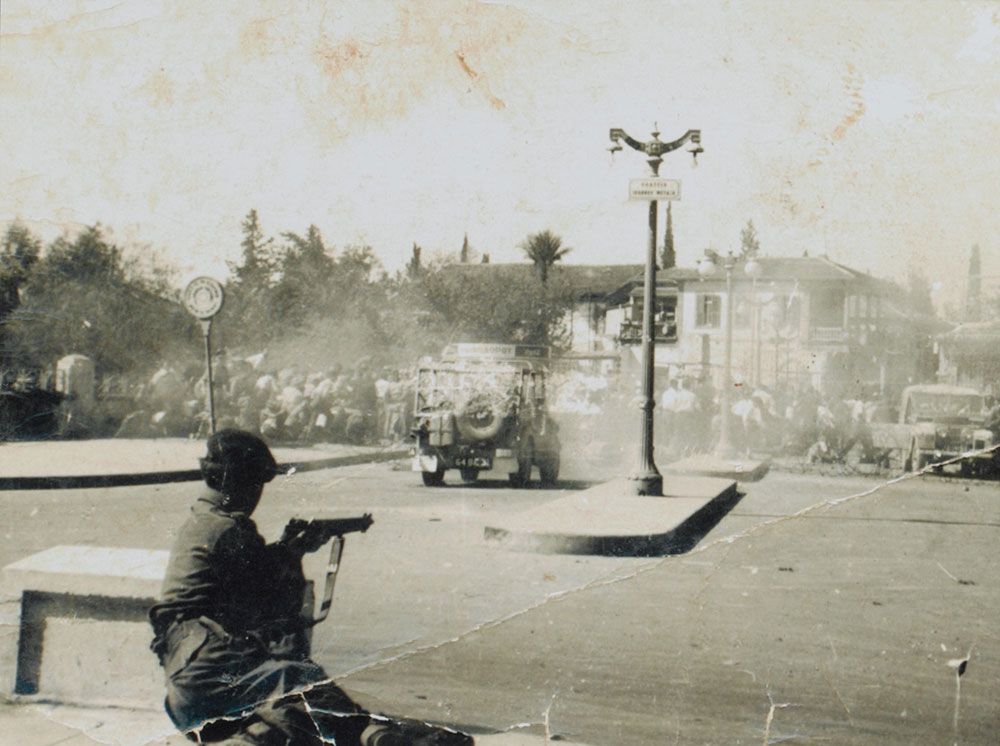
- A street riot during the battle
Date	31 August 1956
Location	Nicosia, Cyprus
Result	EOKA victory

Belligerents
EOKA	British Empire: British Cyprus

Commanders and leaders
Georgios Grivas	Unknown

The Battle of Nicosia Hospital was a military engagement during the Cyprus Emergency. The EOKA planned a raid to rescue Polykarpos Giorkatzis, an EOKA prisoner who had been transferred to hospital. The escape was successful, although the team suffered casualties.
