= 1 April attacks (Cyprus) =

Series of attacks across Cyprus

1 April Attacks
- Part of the Cyprus Emergency
Date	1 April 1955
Location	Nicosia and Famagusta, Cyprus
Result	EOKA victory: Destruction of British facilities across the island; Beginning of the Cyprus Emergency

Belligerents
EOKA	British Empire: British Cyprus

Commanders and leaders
Georgios Grivas; Markos Drakos; Grigoris Afxentiou	Governor Sir Robert Armitage

Casualties and losses
1 killed (Modestos Panteli)	Unknown

The 1 April Attacks were a series of attacks across Cyprus in 1955 by the Ethniki Organosis Kyprion Agoniston (EOKA) which led to the start of the Cyprus Emergency. Multiple British locations were attacked after midnight by EOKA members. This attack was accompanied by the distribution of leaflets across Cyprus.

== Attack ==
On the night of 31 March–1 April 1955, simultaneous attacks were launched across the island after midnight at various British or British-linked facilities, including:

- in Nicosia, the government radio station, the Secretariat, the Education Office and the installations behind Wolseley barracks (this attack was led by Markos Drakos);
- in Larnaca, the central police station, the district administration, the court building, the police superintendent's home, Commissioner Muftizade's home;
- in Limassol, the central police station, the police station of Ayios Ioannis quarter, the Episkopi garrison; in Limassol district also sustained heavy damage by the explosions.
- in Famagusta district, the depot of the army camp near the Famagusta-Larnaca road, the fuel tank of the Dhekelia garrison power station. (The latter attack was led by Grigoris Afxentiou).

During this attack, Modestos Panteli of the EOKA died from electric shock trying to cut a cable, the first casualty of the Emergency. The attacks were accompanied by the distribution of leaflets from EOKA claiming responsibility and calling on Cypriots to participate in the struggle. Several EOKA officers were arrested in connection to the attacks and sentenced to long prison terms.
