= Grigoris Afxentiou =

Greek-Cypriot insurgent leader (1928–1957)

Second Lieutenant Grigoris Afxentiou
- Γρηγόρης Αυξεντίου
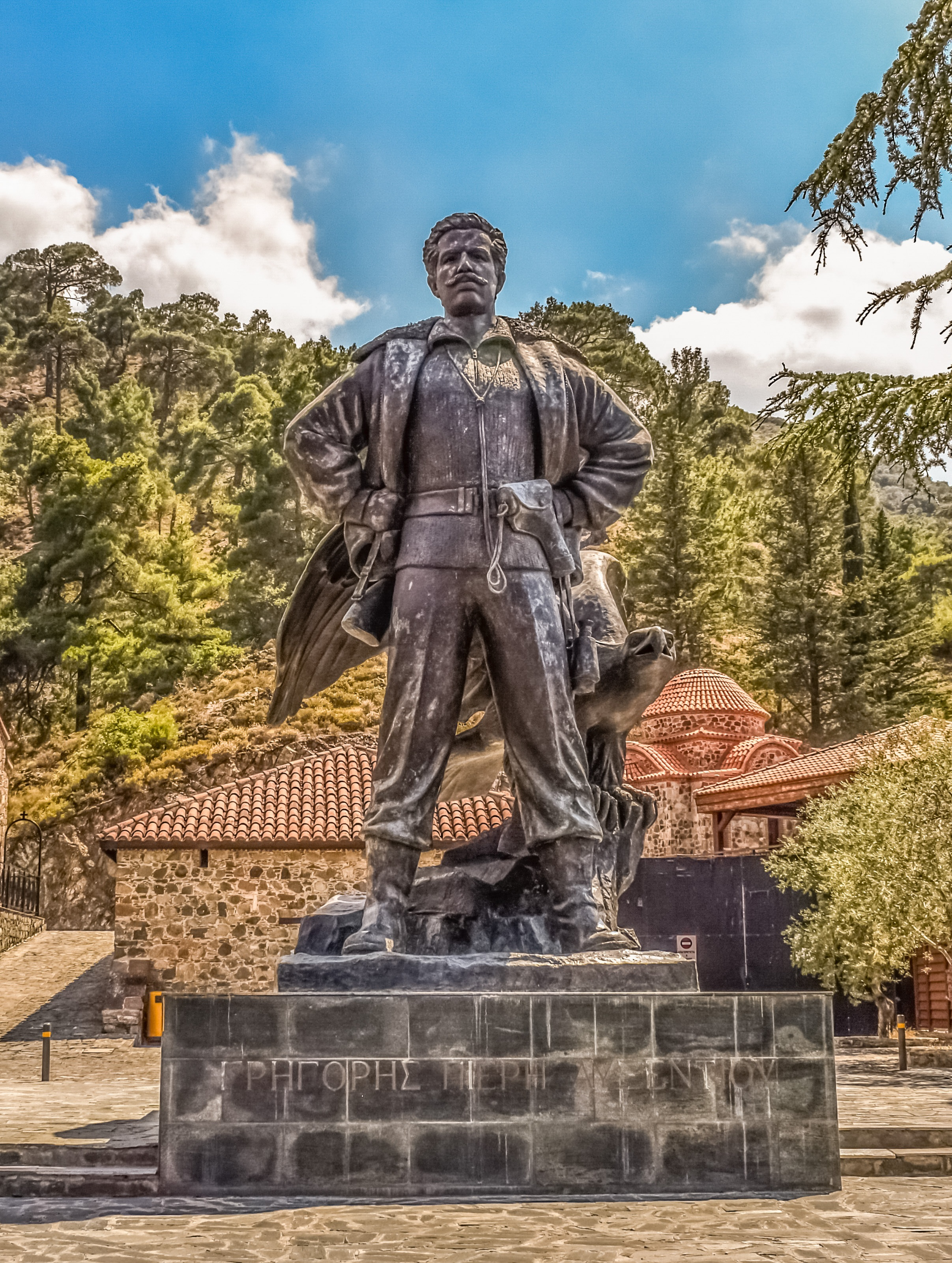
- Born: Grigorios Pieris Afxentiou (Γρηγόριος Πιερής Αυξεντίου); 22 February 1928; Lysi, British Cyprus
- Died: 3 March 1957 (aged 29); Lazanias, British Cyprus
- Military career
- Allegiance: Kingdom of Greece
- Branch: Hellenic Army; EOKA
- Service years: 1949-1953 (Hellenic Army); 1955-1957 (EOKA)
- Rank: Second Lieutenant
- Nickname: Zidros (Ζήδρος)
- Commands: Second-in-command of EOKA
- Conflicts: Cyprus Emergency: 1 April Attacks; Nicosia Cinema Bombing; Battle of Spilia
- Other work: Taxi driver

Grigoris Pieris Afxentiou (Greek: Γρηγόρης Πιερής Αυξεντίου; 22 February 1928 – 3 March 1957) was a Greek-Cypriot insurgent leader who led campaigns against the British colonial government as a member of EOKA. He was second-in-command to general Georgios Grivas and used the pseudonym Zidhros (Ζήδρος), the name of a famous 18th-century brigand.

== Biography ==
Afxentiou was born on 22 February 1928 in the village of Lysi, the son of Antonia and Pieris Afxentiou. He had a younger sister named Chrystala. He attended Lysi Primary School and received his secondary education at the Hellenic Gymnasium in Famagusta. Reports by those who knew him were that he was a keen sportsman and passionate about football. He supported the football team Anorthosis.

Afxentiou left for Greece, where he was unsuccessful in gaining a place at the Hellenic Military Academy in Athens. In December 1949, he joined the Hellenic Army as a volunteer. From March to October 1950, he attended the Infantry Reserve Officers' Academy on the island of Syros. He then served with the Hellenic Army on the Greek-Bulgarian frontier, as a second lieutenant, before returning to Cyprus and joining the EOKA struggle. He was discharged from the ranks of the Greek Army on 15 November 1953 and returned to Cyprus, where he helped his father with his business by working as a taxi driver. At that time he also got engaged to be married.

Afxentiou joined the National Organization of Cypriot Fighters (EOKA) where he soon became second-in-command, adjutant to EOKA leader Georgios Grivas. He was originally assigned the regional command of the district of Famagusta which he knew well. It was Grigoris Afxentiou who first thought of obtaining explosives from the sea bed, in shallow waters off the coast of Famagusta, as used by local fishermen to dynamite fish. Explosives were made from the surplus shells dumped in the sea by the British after the end of World War II. Afxentiou was well liked by his peers and it did not take long for General Grivas to promote him to Commander of the Kyrenia district.

=== Cypriot War of Union (in favour of Union with Greece) alongside Greek support ===
In the spring of 1955, he conducted attacks against the Cyprus Broadcasting Corporation and the sole electricity company in Nicosia. Known by the code name Zidhros (Ζήδρος), since the day of his attacks, he was top of the list of most wanted men by the colonial government. They initially proclaimed a reward of £250 for his arrest, which was soon raised to £1,000, and then £5,000 for blowing up property of the colonial government.

When the reward was proclaimed, he went into hiding in the Pentadactylos mountain range where he trained EOKA fighters on weapon use and guerrilla warfare. He was very active in the Pentadaktylos range as well as Mount Troodos. During October 1955, on the day after Field Marshal Harding's arrival on Cyprus, Afxentiou raided Lefkoniko Police Station in broad daylight and seized the entire armoury stored there. Although the raid was planned well in advance, it clearly appeared as a challenge to the authority of the Field Marshal, who thereafter pursued Afxentiou zealously. In December 1955, Afxentiou was relocated on orders of General Grivas to the Troodos mountain range and the General's hideout at Spilia, which led to Afxentiou's involvement in the Battle of Spilia.

On 3 March 1957, after a Cypriot informant had betrayed his location, British Army troops surrounded Afxentiou outside his secret hideout near the Machairas Monastery near Lazanias. At the time, inside the hideout were Afxentiou and four fellow guerrilla fighters. Realising he was outnumbered, Afxentiou ordered his comrades to surrender but stayed behind to fight to the death. The British asked Afxentiou to surrender his weapons, to which he replied "molon labe" ("come and take them"), quoting Leonidas I of Sparta. Afxentiou then used his submachine gun to kill a corporal of the Duke of Wellington's Regiment before dying after the Royal Engineers poured petrol down the slope into the dugout and set it on fire. The British buried his body at the Imprisoned Graves in the yard of the Central Jail of Nicosia , where he remains interred to this day.

== Legacy ==
The monks at the Machairas monastery have built a museum about Afxentiou and near the place where he died, a statue in his memory was erected.

In Akritas of Macedonia, Greece operates the Historical Museum - Akrita Outpost "Grigoris Afxentiou", who served as a reserve lieutenant in the Akrita outpost.

== Sources ==
- The Memoirs of General Grivas by George Grivas, edited by Charles Foley. Longmans. London. 1964.
- Grigoris Afxentiou, a Cypriot fighter
- Learn About Cyprus article (Greek language article about Grigoris Afxentiou)
