= Spilia, Cyprus =

Spilia: Σπήλια (Greek); Spilya (Turkish)
- Village
- Location in Cyprus
- Coordinates: 34°57′56″N 32°57′15″E
- Country: Cyprus
- District: Nicosia District

Government
  - Type: Community council

Population (2011)
  - Total: 123
- Time zone: UTC+2 (EET)
  - Summer (DST): UTC+3 (EEST)

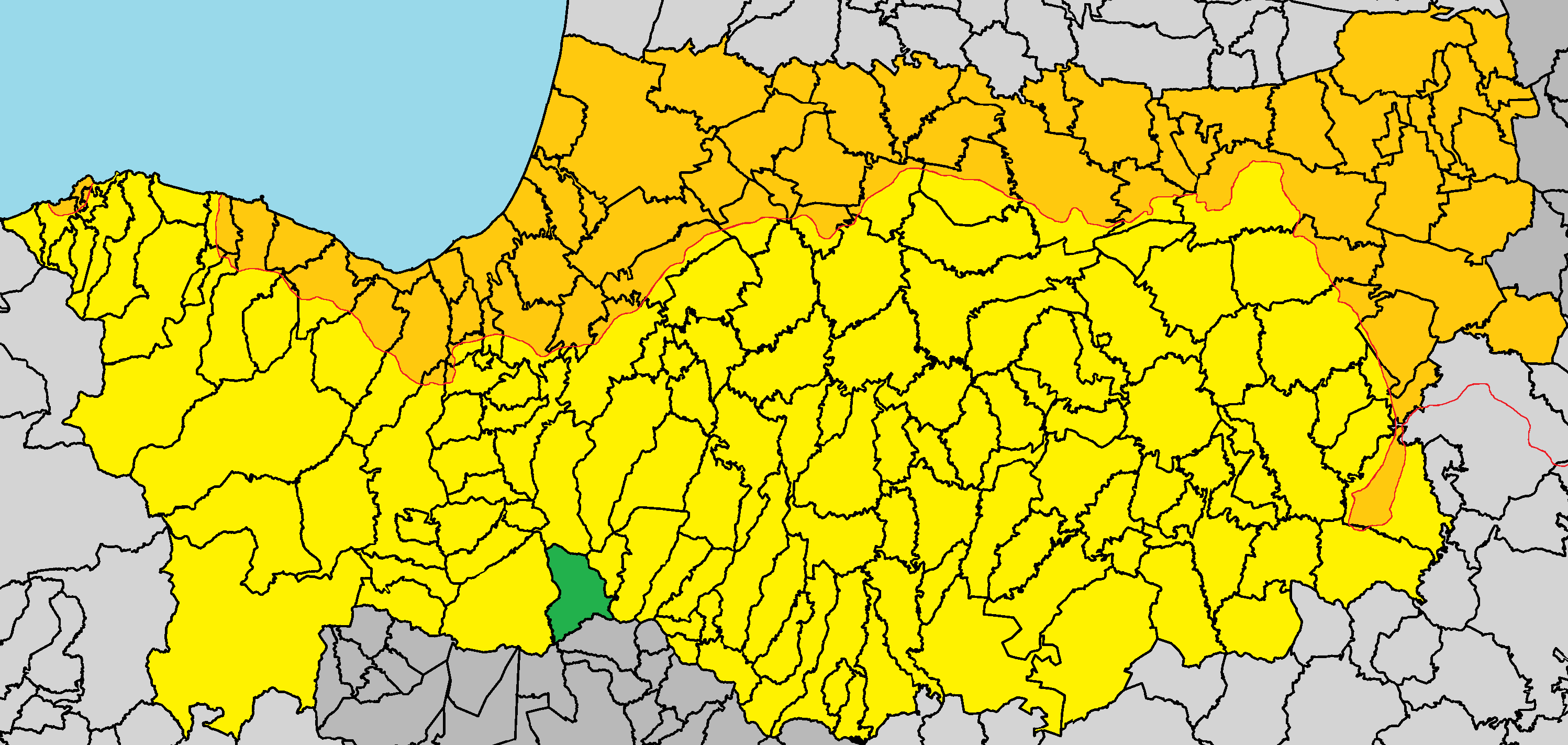
Location of Spilia,Cyprus

Spilia (Greek: Σπήλια; Turkish: Spilya) is a small village in the Nicosia District of Cyprus, located near Kyperounta. The hamlet of Kourdali is part of it.
