= Heinz A. Richter =

German historian (1939–2024)

- Born: 18 March 1939; Heilbronn, Gau Württemberg-Hohenzollern, Germany
- Died: 7 March 2024 (aged 84); Schriesheim, Baden-Württemberg, Germany
- Occupations: Historian, academic, author
- Writing career
- Language: German, Greek
- Subjects: World War I in Greece; World War II in Greece history of modern Greece modern history of Cyprus; Greco-Turkish War (1919-1922)

Heinz A. Richter (18 March 1939 – 7 March 2024) was a German historian, known for his work on the history of World War II in the Balkans, the history of modern Greece and the modern history of Cyprus.

== Biography ==
Heinz A. Richter was born on 18 March 1939, in Heilbronn, in northern Baden-Württemberg, Germany. He started reading Greek mythology at a very young age and, in high school, his professor of History "excited his interest for classical Greek antiquity." Richter studied History, Political Science and English Literature at the Heidelberg University. He was professor of Greek and Cypriot modern history at the University of Mannheim from 1991 up to 2003.

In his book Griechenland im Zweiten Weltkrieg 1939-1941, Richter provided a narrative account of the war in the Balkans from the Greek and Allied side, using published sources only.

Richter also commented on the current state of the affairs of Greece, as well as Cyprus.

== Controversy ==
In November 2014, the University of Crete awarded Richter an honoris Ph.D. for his historical work. The award provoked protests by some Greek historians and other academics who claimed that Richter, in his work, has "smeared" the reputation of Cretan resistance and assigned "noble incentives" to the Nazi invaders. Additionally, in an interview Richter gave to the Greek newspaper Kathimerini, he spoke of the destruction brought upon Greek islands and villages by "the Germans, the Italians, the communists and the nationalists", which some Greek commentators viewed as "moral relativism," assigning equal weight to the actions of the occupation forces and the local Greek guerrillas.

Richter rejected all the accusations against his work, stating that his duty as a historian is to relate what he "believe[s] to be the historical truth," and defending the point he made that "until Operation Mercury, World War Two had been a relatively 'clean' war, with both sides respecting the laws of war." The university's authorities initially declined the appeals made by Greek politicians and academics and rejected the claims of bias. Εventually, and after a formal, intra-university appeal, the university voted to remove his title in 2016. Richter stated that he felt "honored" to be only the second German academic to ever have his academic title removed, the first being, as he claimed, Thomas Mann by the Nazis. The revocation finally went through in 2018. In December 2021, the Council of State rejected Richter's application to annul the revocation, making it final within the Greek legal system.

== Τrial ==
In November 2015, Athens' public prosecutor indicted Richter under Art. 2 of "anti-racist" and "hate speech" law 4285/2014, for "denying Nazi crimes against the people of Crete." Many Greek academics signed statements defending Richter from the accusations. The Athens-based European Society of Modern Greek Studies also issued statements supporting him.

On 10 February 2016, Richter, after being tried in absentia, was found innocent of all charges.

== Death and obituary ==
Richter died on 7 March 2024, at the age of 84.

Greek historians Stratos Dordanas, Vaios Kalogrias, Nikos Papanastasiou, and Andreas Stergiou wrote his obituary in Kathimerini, which offered a generally favorable assessment of Richter's life, career and scholarship.

== Awards ==
In 2000, Richter was presented by the Greek President Kostis Stephanopoulos, for his "exceptional acts, which raised the international prestige of Greece," with the Gold Cross of the Order of the Phoenix.

== Selected works ==
- Griechenland: zwischen Revolution und Konterrevolution 1936–1946 (Greece: Between revolution and counter-revolution 1936-1946), Europäische Verlagsanstalt, Frankfurt, 1973; Δύo επαvαστάσεις και αvτεπαvαστάσεις στηv Eλλάδα 1936–1946 (Two revolutions and counter-revolutions in Greece 1936-1946), Exantas, Athens, 1977
- British Intervention in Greece: From Varkiza to Civil War, February 1945 – August 1946, Merlin Press, London, 1986; Η επέμβαση τωv Άγγλωv στηv Ελλάδα: Από τη Βάρκιζα στov Εμφύλιo Πόλεμο, Hestia, Athens, 1997
- Griechenland im Zweiten Weltkrieg, August 1939 – Juni 1941 (Greece in the Second World War, August 1939 - June 1941), Syndikat, Bodenheim, 1997; Η Ιταλο–γερμανική επίθεση εναντίον της Ελλάδος (The Italian-German attack against Greece), Govostis, Athens, 1998–1999
- Operation Merkur: Die Eroberung der Insel Kreta im Mai 1941 (Operation Mercury: The Conquest of Crete in May 1941), Rutzen, Ruhpolding, 2011; Η μάχη της Κρήτης (The battle of Crete), Govostis, Athens, 2011
- Griechenland 1940–1950: Die Zeit der Bürgerkriege (Greece 1940–1950: The Time of the Civil Wars), Harrassowitz, Wiesbaden, 2012
- Griechenland 1950–1974: Zwischen Diktatur und Demokratie (Greece 1950–1974: Between Dictatorship and Democracy), Verlag Franz Philipp Rutzen, Mainz/Ruhpolding, 2013
- Der Krieg im Südosten, Band 1: Gallipoli 1915 (The War in the Southeast, Volume 1: Gallipoli 1915), Rutzen, Ruhpolding, 2014
- Der Krieg im Südosten, Band 2: Makedonien 1915–1918 (The War in the Southeast, Volume 2: Macedonia 1915–1918), Rutzen, Ruhpolding, 2014
- Geschichte Griechenlands im 20. Jahrhundert, Band 1: 1900–1939 (History of Greece in the 20th Century, Volume 1: 1900–1939), 2nd revised edition, Rutzen, Mainz/Ruhpolding, 2015
- Geschichte Griechenlands im 20. Jahrhundert, Band 2: 1939–2004 (History of Greece in the 20th Century, Volume 2: 1939–2004), Rutzen, Mainz/Ruhpolding, 2015
- Griechenland 1945–1946: Die britische Intervention (Greece 1945–1946: The British Intervention), Harrassowitz, Wiesbaden, 2016
- Der griechisch-türkische Krieg 1919–1922 (The Greek-Turkish War 1919–1922), Harrassowitz, Wiesbaden, 2016; Ο ελληνοτουρκικός πόλεμος 1919–1922: Από το όνειρο της «Μεγάλης Ιδέας» στη Μικρασιατική Καταστροφή, Govostis, Athens, 2020
- Mythen und Legenden in der griechischen Zeitgeschichte (Myths and Legends in Modern Greek History), Harrassowitz, Wiesbaden, 2016
- Hellas und Zypern in meinem Leben: Erinnerungen eines Zeithistorikers (Greece and Cyprus in My Life: Memoirs of a Contemporary Historian), Harrassowitz, Wiesbaden, 2017
- Geschichte der griechischen Linken (History of the Greek Left), Harrassowitz, Wiesbaden, 2017
- Das Osmanische Reich im Ersten Weltkrieg bis zum Friedensschluss 1923 (The Ottoman Empire in the First World War up to the Peace Treaty of 1923), Harrassowitz, Wiesbaden, 2018
- Die türkischen Meerengen in der internationalen Politik 1900–1917 (The Turkish Straits in International Politics 1900–1917), Harrassowitz, Wiesbaden, 2018
- Die Griechen im Osmanischen Reich 1913–1923: Ihre Verfolgung und Vertreibung (The Greeks in the Ottoman Empire 1913–1923: Their Persecution and Expulsion), Harrassowitz, Wiesbaden, 2018; Ο ελληνισμός στην Οθωμανική Αυτοκρατορία: Εκτοπισμοί, διωγμοί και ξεριζωμός (1913–1923), Govostis, Athens, 2021
- Greek History in the 20th Century: Collected Articles (Greece in the 20th Century: Collected Articles), Harrassowitz, Wiesbaden, 2021
- Cyprus in the 19th & 20th Century: Collected Articles, Harrassowitz, Wiesbaden, 2021
- The Conflicts of the Aegean in the 20th Century (Die Ägäiskonflikte im 20. Jahrhundert), Harrassowitz, Wiesbaden, 2022
- Griechenland von der deutschen Besatzung zur britischen Okkupation (Greece from the German Occupation to the British Occupation), Harrassowitz, Wiesbaden, 2022
- Aspekte griechischer Geschichte im II. Weltkrieg (Aspects of Greek History in the Second World War), Harrassowitz, Wiesbaden, 2022
- Smyrna 1922: Ein Augenzeugenbericht (Smyrna 1922: An Eyewitness Account), Harrassowitz, Wiesbaden, 2022
