= Central Jail of Nicosia =

Prison in Cyprus

Coordinates: 35°10′48.47″N 33°20′40.44″E

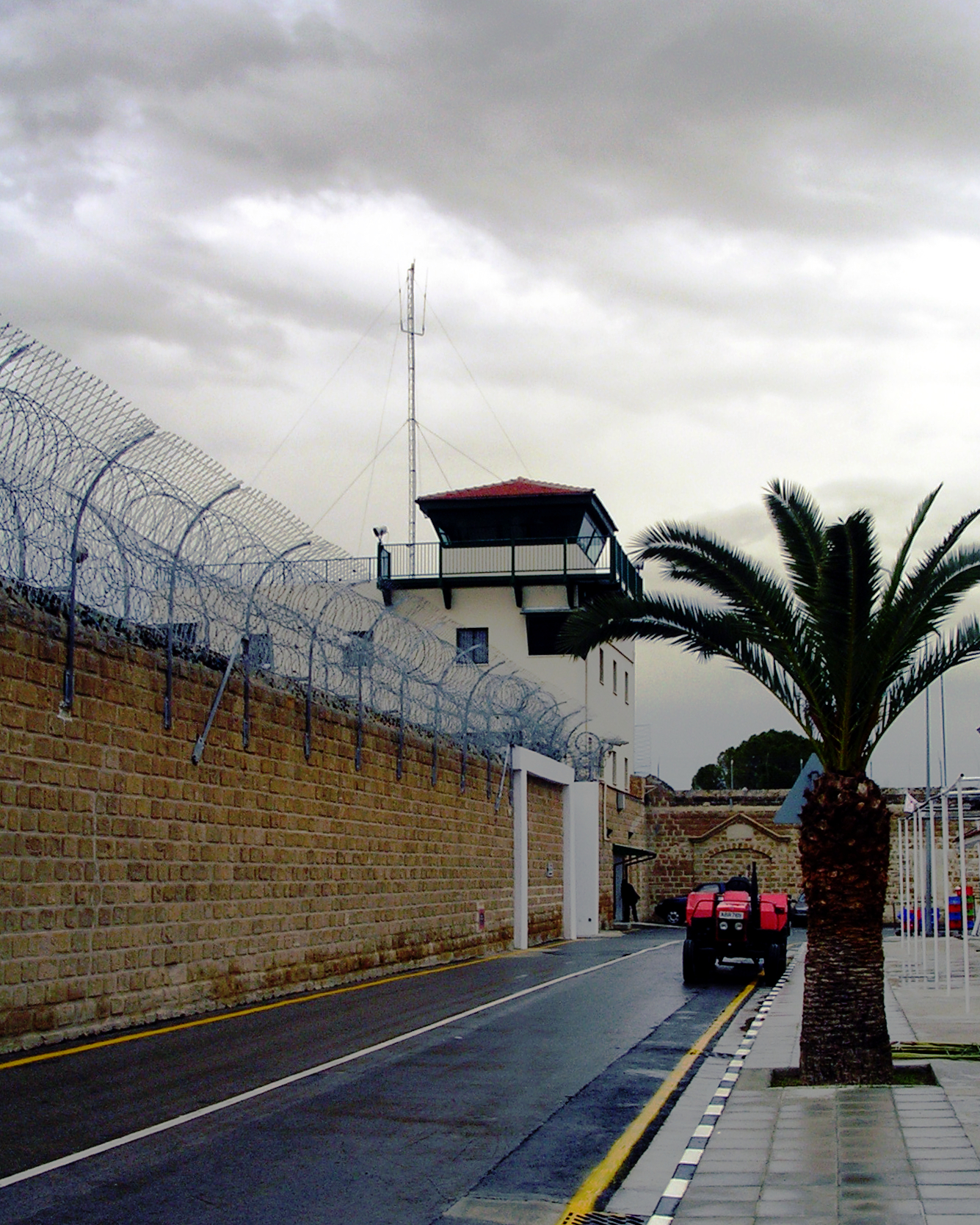
Watch post in Nicosia Central Jail

The Central Jail of Nicosia (Greek: Κεντρικές Φυλακές Λευκωσίας) is the only prison of the Republic of Cyprus. The unrecognized republic of Northern Cyprus also has its own prison.

The Central Jail of Nicosia is run by the Cyprus Prisons Department. It is located west of the walled part of Nicosia, south of the Green Line. Convicted prisoners and defendants held on remand of both sexes and of all age groups from 16 years and over are held in the facility. With rare exceptions, all prisoners in Cyprus are held there. Some small off-site facilities of the Cyprus Prisons Department have been declared as prisons, for use when there is a need to keep a prisoner separate from the general population.

== History ==
The Nicosia Central Prison was built by the British in 1894 and was in use until 1955 as a place of detention of those condemned by the courts to imprisonment, but also as a place of temporary detention of persons under judicial decree. During the Turkish invasion of Cyprus (1974) battles raged around the Central Jail of Lefkosia. Vastly outnumbered, the Cypriot national guardsmen - aided by corrections officers - managed to fight off the Turks and keep the prison from being captured.

The prison has a mix of single-person cells, cells for two inmates, and larger shared rooms for recreational activities. Prisoners on remand are kept separate from convicted prisoners, and prisoners under 21 and female prisoners have their own blocks. There is a "Special Observation Block" for prisoners deemed to be at risk of self-harm or other vulnerabilities. The prison is divided into three sections. The Closed Prison is used to house prisoners in high-security conditions. The Open Prison, which is intended for prisoners who have served a quarter to one-third of their sentences and who have shown good conduct, has lax conditions with all prisoners having their own cells. The Guidance Centre for out of Prison Employment and Rehabilitation of Prisoners, which houses prisoners who have shown good conduct and are within twelve months of release, has extremely lax conditions, and prisoners held there work outside the prison.

A variety of workshops, kitchens, and a farm exist in the prison, where prisoners work as cooks, tailors, carpenters, electricians, barbers, mechanics, gardeners, and farmers. Unless given a medical exemption or over retirement age, all prisoners are expected to work. Vocational classes are offered to inmates, including approved correspondence courses. The prison has television rooms, gymnasiums, a theatre for live shows performed by prisoners, a church, a mosque, school, library, facilities for football, volleyball, and basketball games, and two visiting areas where family and friends may visit prisoners. The prison has two medical facilities. The prison is also the location of the Imprisoned Graves, where 13 EOKA fighters who lost their lives during the Cyprus Emergency, nine of whom were executed by the British in the prison, three were killed in action, and one died in hospital from battle wounds, are interred. A section of the prison grounds where the Imprisoned Graves are located along with the nearby condemned cells and gallows room where EOKA prisoners condemned to death were held and executed has been converted into a museum open to the public.

== See also ==
- Büyük Han
