= Cyprus Emergency =

1955–1959 military conflict in Cyprus

- Part of the Cyprus problem and Decolonization
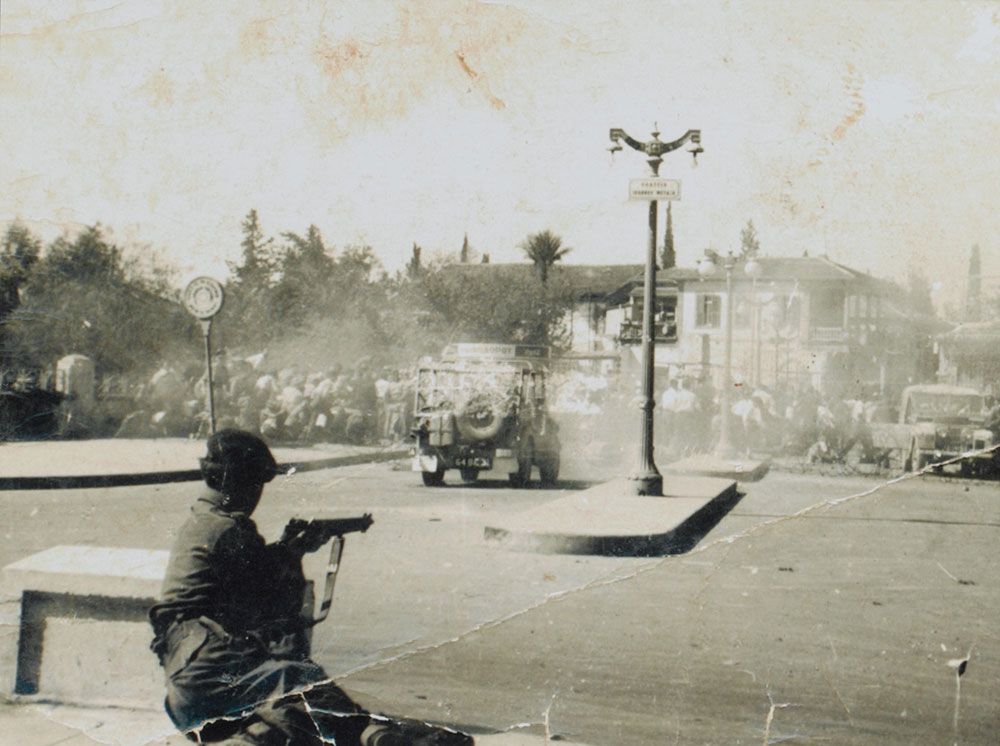
- A street riot in Nicosia during the Battle at Nicosia Hospital in 1956
| Date | 1 April 1955 – 19 March 1959 (3 years, 11 months, 2 weeks and 4 days) |
| Location | British Cyprus |
| Result | London and Zürich Agreements: Independence of the Republic of Cyprus; Enosis and Taksim not achieved; Britain retains bases at Akrotiri and Dhekelia; EOKA not defeated |

Belligerents
| United Kingdom: British Cyprus; Turkey; Special Warfare Department; Turkish Resistance Organisation; 9 September Front; AKEL | EOKA |

Commanders and leaders
| Harold Macmillan (from 1957); Anthony Eden (until 1957); Hugh Foot (from 1957) John Harding (until 1957) (Turkey) Major General Daniş Karabelen Colonel Ali Riza Vuruskan; Rauf Denktaş Ulus Ülfet † | Georgios Grivas; Grigoris Afxentiou †; Tassos Papadopoulos; Markos Drakos †; Kyriakos Matsis †; Renos Kyriakides |

Strength
| (British Empire) 40,000 (Turkey) 4,000 policemen | 300 fighters 1,000 active underground |

Casualties and losses
| British Armed Forces: 104 dead 601 injured Police: 51 dead 187 wounded | 102–112 killed (85–95 in combat); Unknown injured |
- Greek Cypriot civilians: 252 killed and 263 injured Turkish Cypriots civilians: 62 killed and 150 injured

The Cyprus Emergency (Note: Also known as the Cyprus Liberation Struggle 1955–1959 (Greek: Απελευθερωτικός Αγώνας της Κύπρου 1955–1959), the Greek Cypriot War of Independence (Greek: Ελληνοκυπριακός Πόλεμος της Ανεξαρτησίας) or the Cypriot War of Independence (Greek: Κυπριακός Πόλεμος της Ανεξαρτησίας) among Greeks and Greek Cypriots, and the 1955–1959 Cyprus events (Turkish: 1955–1959 Kıbrıs olayları) among Turkish and Turkish Cypriots.) was a conflict fought in British Cyprus between April 1955 and March 1959.

The National Organisation of Cypriot Fighters (EOKA), a Greek Cypriot guerrilla organisation fighting for unification with Greece, began an armed campaign in support of the end of British colonial rule and the unification of Cyprus and Greece (Enosis) in 1955. Opposition to Enosis from Turkish Cypriots led to the formation of the Turkish Resistance Organisation (TMT) in support of the partition of Cyprus. The Cyprus Emergency ended in 1959 with the signature of the London-Zürich Agreements, establishing the Republic of Cyprus as an independent state.

== Background ==
The island of Cyprus can trace its Hellenic roots back to the 12th century BC with the immigration of Mycenaean Greeks to the island. Many civilisations passed through the island leaving remnants behind, including that of the Franks, Venetians, Assyrians etc.

Cyprus was a territory of the Ottoman Empire from the late 16th century until it became a protectorate of the United Kingdom under nominal Ottoman suzerainty at the Cyprus Convention of 4 June 1878 after the Russo-Turkish War. In 1915, Cyprus was formally annexed into the British Empire after the Ottomans had entered World War I on the side of the Central Powers against the British, and it was initially governed by a military administration until 1925, when it was proclaimed the Crown Colony of Cyprus. From the 1910s to the 1950s, Greek Cypriots became increasingly dissatisfied with British rule and supportive of Enosis, the concept of political unification between Cyprus and Greece. Several unsuccessful offers made to Greece by the British to cede Cyprus in exchange for military concessions, as well as the noticeable lack of British investment on the island, caused a growing Cypriot nationalist movement.

In October 1931, Greek Cypriots rebelled against British rule and destroyed government property. However, the demonstrations were suppressed and Britain took dictatorial measures against the Cypriot people; these became known as the "Palmerocracy", owing to the name of the Governor of Cyprus, Richmond Palmer. These measures were in place until the start of World War II.

In 1950, the Church of Cyprus held a referendum for Greek Cypriots on the subject of union with Greece. This referendum had a turnout rate of 89% of Greek Cypriots, and 95.7% of those in favour of union with Greece; the British government did not recognize the referendum, and refused to negotiate.

In 1954, Britain announced its intention to transfer its Suez military headquarters (the office of the Commander-in-Chief, Middle East) to Cyprus.

== Emergency ==
EOKA leader George Grivas announcement for the campaign against British rule (in Greek)

=== Insurgency ===
On 1 April 1955, the EOKA started its insurgency with the 1 April Attacks. After a series of other incidents, the Governor General Sir John Harding declared a state of emergency on 26 November 1955. Following the example of Malaya, Harding tried to co-ordinate the activities of the civil, military and police authorities, with the specific aim of collecting and processing intelligence. The British encountered great difficulty obtaining effective intelligence on EOKA, as it was supported by the majority of the Greek Cypriot population. As a result, the British were forced to rely on some 4,000 Turkish-Cypriot policemen, who were ostracised by the Greek-Cypriot communities and could provide little information about them. Inevitably, the use of Turkish Cypriot policemen against the Greek Cypriot community exacerbated relations between the two communities. In 1955 however, EOKA had sent letters to the Turkish-Cypriot community in Nicosia stating that their conflict was against the British and not them.

EOKA focused its activity to urban areas totalling 104 house bombings, 53 riots, 136 acts of sabotage, 403 ambushes, 35 attacks on police, 38 attacks on soldiers and 43 raids on police stations. EOKA's aim was to keep the British army away from the Troodos mountains where its main fighters were hiding. Some of the attacks went awry, most notably the bombing of a restaurant by EOKA on 16 June, which led to the death of William P. Boteler, a CIA officer working under diplomatic cover. Grivas immediately issued a statement denying a deliberate attempt to target American citizens.

In October, with the security situation deteriorating, Harding opened talks on the island's future. By this stage, Archbishop Makarios III had become closely identified with the insurgency, and talks broke up without any agreement in early 1956. Makarios was viewed with suspicion by the British authorities, and was later exiled to the Seychelles. News of his arrest triggered a week-long general strike followed by a sharp increase in EOKA activity: 246 attacks through 31 March, including a failed assassination attempt against Harding when a bomb placed under his bed failed to detonate.

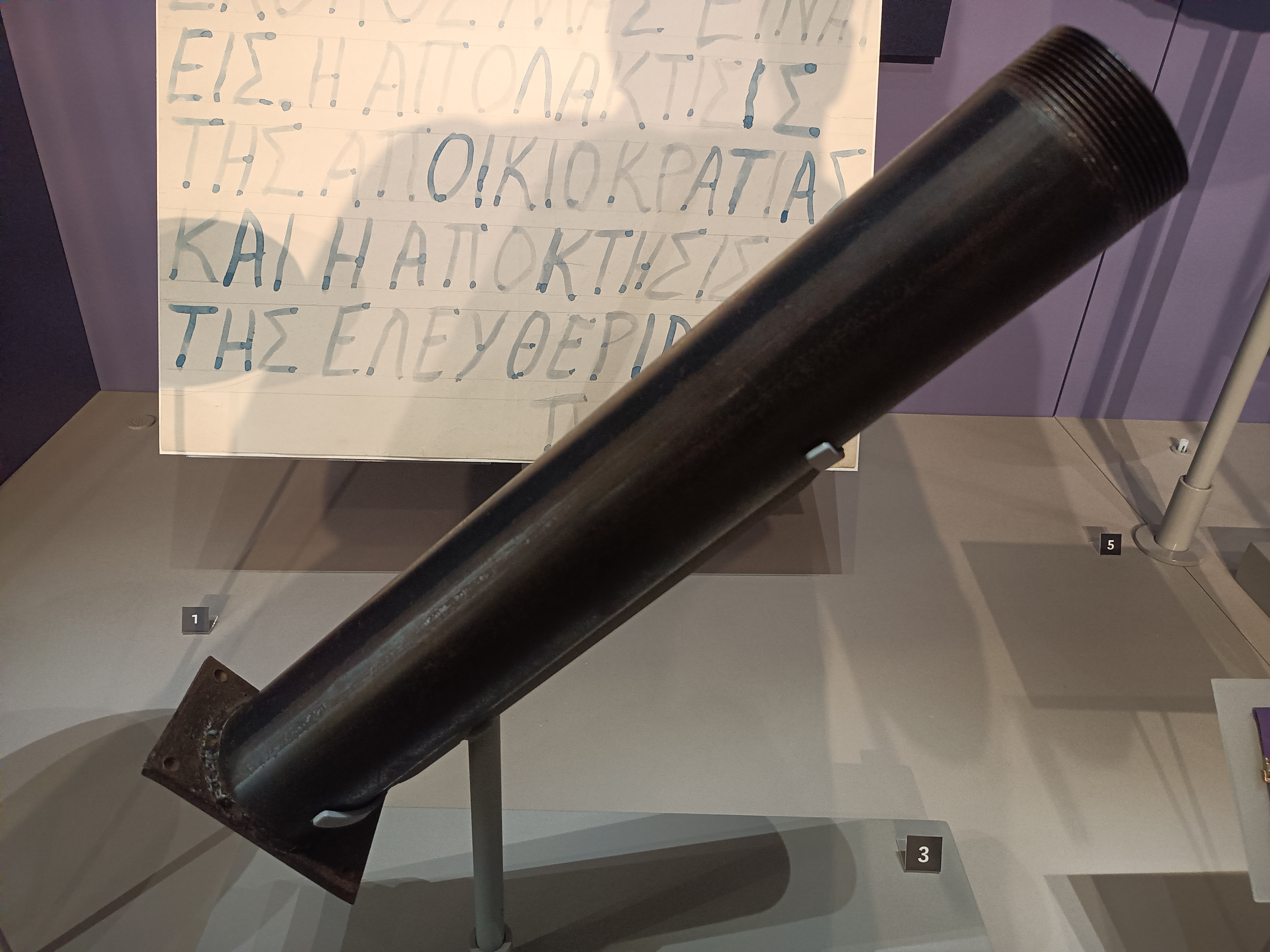
EOKA home-made mortar, circa 1955

=== Counterinsurgency ===
British Order of Battle:

British Empire

British Armed Forces

British Army

Grenadier Guards
Irish Guards
The Royal Scots
Royal Leicestershire Regiment
South Staffordshire Regiment
Oxfordshire and Buckinghamshire Light Infantry
Middlesex Regiment
King's Own Yorkshire Light Infantry
Durham Light Infantry
Gordon Highlanders
Argyll and Sutherland Highlanders
Royal Ulster Rifles
Queen's Own Royal West Kent Regiment
Parachute Regiment
Special Air Service

Royal Air Force

RAF Regiment

Royal Navy

Royal Marines
Special Boat Service

=== Counterinsurgency operations ===
By mid-1956, there were 17,000 British servicemen in Cyprus and Harding was concerned to counter EOKA's mountain units in the Troodos. Nevertheless a number of operations were launched:

Between 21 April and 7 May 1956, the British armed forces mounted an operation codenamed "Kennett", conducted in the Kyrenia range by 1,500 troops who cordoned and searched a dozen villages in a 50 square mile area and arrested eighteen suspects.

From 17 May to 7 June, Britain launched operation "Pepper Pot", an operation that was carried out by the 16th Independent parachute brigade. However, an informant within the Special Branch alerted Grivas of the operation, and as such EOKA was better prepared for the British forces which led to the operation having little effect.

From 7 June to 23 June 1956, Britain launched operation "Lucky Alphonse" in an effort to cripple EOKA and capture George Grivas as a means to bring power to the negotiating table. More than 5,000 British soldiers took part, including units from the Royal Marines, the Parachute Regiment, the Gordon Highlanders and the Royal Norfolk Regiment. Although there were some minor successes, 7 British soldiers were killed in action, with another 21 burned to death by accident during a fire in the Paphos Forest, the operation furthermore failing to capture George Grivas.

From 2 to 21 July, the 16th Independent parachute brigade cordoned thirty villages in the Troodos mountains; assisted by tracker dogs and informers, they arrested three members of three village groups in an operation called "Spread Eagle".

From 22 to 25 July 1956, the British captured seventeen guerrillas and wounded several others trying to breach the cordons during operation "Golden Eagle".

Some of the other operations were considered a success; some fifty guerrillas and a good haul of weapons were captured. Grivas managed to escape and was forced into hiding, leaving behind his diary which yielded important intelligence information. The leading EOKA assassin, Nikos Sampson, had also been captured. Grivas eventually moved to Limassol where he established his new headquarters.

=== Suez Crisis and ceasefire ===
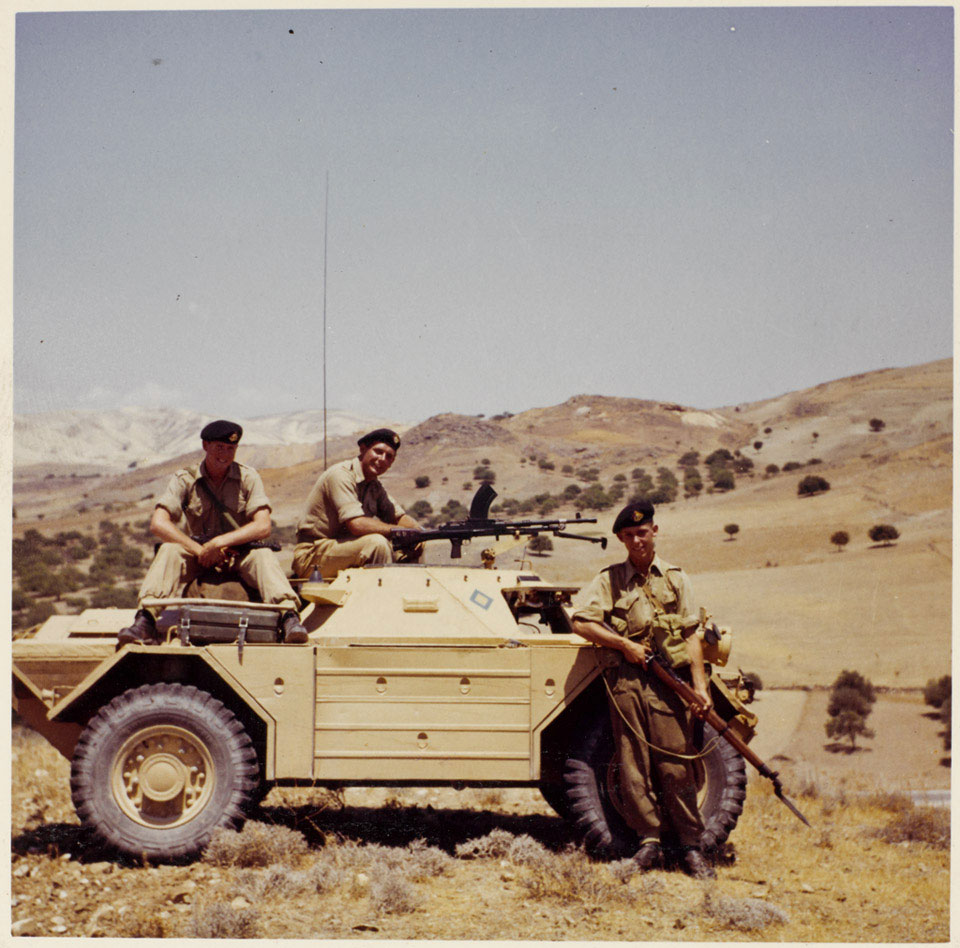
Soldiers of 1st Battalion, The Middlesex Regiment (Duke of Cambridge's Own), with an Mk I Ferret Scout Car in the Troodos mountains, 1957

The Suez Crisis gave EOKA some respite in the autumn of 1956 and some reorganization was achieved in particular the town groups. As a result, British forces did not follow up on the success of the summer operations, much to the frustration of Harding. EOKA stepped up its campaign in what became as 'Black November' for the British with a total of 416 attacks killing 39, including 21 British units. Facing growing criticism in the United Kingdom about his methods employed and their ineffectiveness, Sir John Harding resigned as Governor on 22 October 1957 and was replaced by Sir Hugh Foot in December.

The end of the Suez crisis, although it had resulted in the departure of many of the military from the island, had not reduced the number of active internal security operations as much as EOKA had expected, with the British able to hold their own and reassert control. After Suez campaign had finished, the British military strength was increased to 20,000 and Foote managed to direct a new offensive.

British troops were redeployed and the town groups were being hunted. By the Spring of 1957, the British operations took their toll on EOKA; the security forces arrested around thirty members of the Nicosia town groups and the area commander. In addition, the mountain groups would never be as effective as they had been. Altogether fifteen were killed in combat and another sixty were captured, with the likelihood they would be hanged. Grivas ordered his area commanders to cease active operations. By April, the majority of EOKA's leaders had been killed or captured and their gangs were soon broken up. With the insurgency seemingly defeated, Grivas announced a ceasefire on 17 March.

In November of 1957, EOKA engaged in one of its most significant operations against the British, when an EOKA member employed at RAF Akrotiri smuggled and placed bombs in the engine compartments of two English Electric Canberras, both of which were destroyed along with two other Canberras and a De Havilland Venom that were destroyed by the subsequent fire that consumed the hangar (Sabotage at RAF Akrotiri).

=== Intercommunal violence ===
The ceasefire lasted a whole year; during this time EOKA began to rearm and reorganize and stepped up its activities in different ways. A second phase of the emergency now began as EOKA began to target urban areas where they organized rioting by students. They also used hit squads to target police officers and military personnel. These attacks continued throughout 1957 and into 1958. Grivas was also concerned with increasing communist activity against AKEL, ordering a number of actions against them, which threatened to start a civil war within the Greek Cypriot community. The British delicately fueled this hostility, and in August 1957 a second wave of intra-Greek violence broke out.

The Turkish Resistance Organisation (TMT, Türk Mukavemet Teşkilatı) was formed with the support of the Turkish government, and specifically by the Special Warfare Department, which was a subordinate to it, with Turkish officers heading the organisation. It was set up in order to flare up tensions between the two communities and to achieve their goal of 'Taksim'. TMT used violence against members of its own community (especially on the left) that were not willing to stay in line with their cause. The British tolerated TMT and had leveraged the Turkish Cypriot community and the Turkish government as a means of blocking the demand for Enosis. The British knowing this was getting out of control still managed to exploit the situation.

Intercommunal and intracommunal violence escalated in the summer of 1958 with numerous fatalities. There were approximately 55 assassinations by Turks on Greeks, and 59 assassinations by Greeks on Turks between 7 June and 7 August. A substantial number of Turkish Cypriots were displaced due to the violence.

=== Final operations against EOKA ===
EOKA attacks however continued on the British, who at the same time attempted to stymie them. On 1 September 1958, in the village of Liopetri, the Royal Ulster Rifles were attacked by an EOKA team of four who were all subsequently killed in the ensuing fire fight. Grivas in reaction to this renounced the ceasefire soon after. The outgoing General Officer Commanding and Director of Operations Douglas Kendrew survived an assassination attempt soon after. Kendrew's replacement Major General Kenneth Darling took the initiative by organizing a number of operations.

Darling's first success was the destruction of a major EOKA arms smuggling ring centred on the post office at Paphos. Following this Darling sought to destroy the surviving EOKA groups; one such area was the Western and central region in the Kyrenia Mountains and so Operation Filtertip began on 3 November. The operation, which lasted a month, was a success, and saw the discovery of an arms cache, the arrest of ninety EOKA members, as well as the death of the Kyernia area leader Kyriakos Matsis on 19 November. Even Grivas acknowledged defeat, noting that this was the only success the British had at the time. Nevertheless, there were more successful operations that followed. Notebook which took place in the Paphos area on 18 November, led to the seizure of firearms and bombs, but importantly more arrests; including several village group commanders. This paid dividends which led to further leads and enabled Operations Dovetail and Box Office – which concluded with more success – arrests and the recovery of more arms and ammunition.

As the successes of the security forces increased, the tempo of EOKA's operation in turn decreased. By the end of 1958, EOKA had been dealt a body blow by the continued exertion of pressure by the British. What's more, Darling and Kendrew now had the confidence that they would be able to sustain this in the event of a failure of the political process.

=== End of the emergency ===
During the last months of 1958, all parties had reasons to favour a compromise. The Greek Cypriot side was afraid that partition was becoming more and more imminent, Greece was anxious that the ongoing situation could lead to a war with Turkey, with the latter having to manage the ongoing crises at its eastern borders. The British could also see that the defeat of EOKA was unlikely and also did not want to see NATO destabilizing because of a Greek-Turkish war.

On 5 December, the foreign ministers of Greece and Turkey acknowledged the situation and a series of meetings were arranged that resulted in the London-Zürich Agreements. Makarios reluctantly accepted the agreements abandoning enosis, but the Turkish-Cypriot leadership was enthusiastic about the compromise. This was a compromise solution in which Cyprus would become an independent and sovereign country.

Around the same time the British were still looking for the well hidden George Grivas. MI6 had launched Operation Sunshine in an attempt to pinpoint his whereabouts. After a few months his likely position was found through a combination of intercepts on telephone lines and surveillance of key EOKA personnel. However just when he was about to be arrested diplomatic events had turned significantly that a deal was on the horizon. Darling was concerned that his arrest or assassination would cause the collapse of the ongoing talks. MacMillan was informed and he ordered Sunshine aborted giving instructions to MI6 for Grivas 'to stew in his own juice'.

On 9 March 1959, Grivas declared a ceasefire, though still opposing the agreements. After agreeing to meet with Makarios, Grivas agreed to leave under safe conduct by the British and without ceremony. There was to be an immediate cease-fire, and an amnesty for political crimes committed during the Emergency.

== Aftermath ==
Following the London and Zürich Agreements, Cyprus became an independent republic and as far as liberation being concerned, the EOKA campaign was successful; however, enosis and taksim were ruled out by the treaties signed. Grivas was displeased with the agreements and made his opinions about them public. Britain was allowed to retain control of some 254km2 (98 square miles) which consisted of two Sovereign Base Areas at Akrotiri and Dhekelia also known as British Forces Cyprus including some other facilities on the island which do not form part of the SBAs.

=== Further intercommunal violence and Turkish invasion ===
Despite having agreed to independence, Turkey soon regarded Cyprus with grave suspicion, feeling that they had been betrayed by the British. For the new constitution to work in practice, some degree of co-operation between the two communities would be essential, which many viewed as unworkable. This view proved correct, and after years of unrest, violence, and disagreement, a buffer zone was established in the last days of 1963 directed by Major-General Peter Young, commander of the British Joint Force (later known as the Truce Force and a predecessor of the present UN force). It was fully established on 4 March 1964, then extended on 9 August after the Battle of Tillyria, and extended again in 1974, after the ceasefire of 16 August 1974, following the Turkish invasion of Cyprus. This became known as the United Nations Buffer Zone in Cyprus, and is commonly referred to as the 'Green Line'.

=== Torture and extrajudicial killings ===
At least 14 Cypriots (including a minor) arrested on suspicion of being EOKA members, were tortured then killed by UK forces during detention. Witnesses – both surviving detainees and UK veterans – recall various kinds of torture and inhumane treatment of detainees.

The British government agreed in January 2019 to pay £1 million to a total of 33 Cypriots who had been allegedly tortured by British forces during the uprising. They included a woman, aged 16 at the time, who said that she had been detained and repeatedly raped by soldiers, and a man who had lost a kidney as a result of his interrogation. The payout followed the declassification of government documents in 2012, but Foreign Minister Alan Duncan stated that "the settlement does not constitute any admission of liability" although "the government has settled the case in order to draw a line under this litigation and to avoid the further escalation of costs".

== See also ==
- List of massacres in Cyprus
- Palestine Emergency (1944–1948)
- Kenyan Emergency (1952–1960)
- Nyasaland Emergency (1958–1960)
- Independence of Malta (1964)

== Bibliography ==
- Calame, Jon; Charlesworth, Esther (2011). Divided Cities: Belfast, Beirut, Jerusalem, Mostar, and Nicosia. University of Pennsylvania Press. ISBN 9780812206852.
- Fremont-Barnes, Gregory, ed. (2015). A History of Counterinsurgency 2 Volumes. Bloomsbury Publishing. ISBN 9798216097310.
- French, David (2015). Fighting EOKA: The British Counter-Insurgency Campaign on Cyprus, 1955–1959. Oxford: Oxford University Press. ISBN 978-0198729341.
- Harbottle, Michael (1994). "Peacekeeping and Peacebuilding Along Borders". In Schofield, Clive H. (ed.). Global Boundaries: World Boundaries Volume 1. Routledge. ISBN 978-1-134-88035-5.
- Heinlein, Frank (2013). British Government Policy and Decolonisation, 1945–63: Scrutinising the Official Mind. Taylor & Francis. ISBN 9781135284343.
- Holland, Robert (1998). Britain and the Revolt in Cyprus, 1954–1959. Oxford: Clarendon Press. ISBN 9780198205388.
- Isachenko, Daria (2012). The Making of Informal States: Statebuilding in Northern Cyprus and Transdniestria. Palgrave Macmillan. ISBN 9780230392069.
- Kraemer, Joseph S (Winter 1971). "Revolutionary Guerrilla Warfare & the Decolonization Movement". Polity. 4 (2): 137–158. doi:10.2307/3234160. JSTOR 3234160. S2CID 155657462.
- Menelaou, Iakovos (2021). The Rhetoric of the Cyprus Problem. Trivent Publishing. ISBN 9786158182140.
- Newsinger, John (2016). British Counterinsurgency. Palgrave Macmillan. ISBN 978-1-137-31686-8.
- Netzley, Patricia D (2009). Terrorism. Greenhaven Publishing LLC. ISBN 9780737746228.
- Novo, Andrew R (2022). The EOKA Cause Nationalism and the Failure of Cypriot Enosis. Bloomsbury Academic. ISBN 9780755635344.
- Richter, Heinz A (2010). A Concise History of Modern Cyprus. Harrassowitz Verlag. ISBN 978-3447062121.
- van der Bijl, Nicholas (2014). The Cyprus Emergency: The Divided Island 1955–1974. Pen and Sword. ISBN 9781844682508. OCLC 660553164.
