= EOKA =

1955–1959 Greek nationalist guerrilla organisation in Cyprus

EOKA Εθνική Οργάνωσις Κυπρίων Αγωνιστών National Organisation of Cypriot Fighters
- EOKA flag
- Leaders: George Grivas; Grigoris Afxentiou
- Dates active: 1955–1959
- Headquarters: British Cyprus
- Ideology: Enosis; Greek nationalism Anti-imperialism; Anti-Turkish sentiment Anti-British sentiment Anti-communism; Religious conservatism
- Political position: Right-wing
- Size: 300 regulars 1,000 active underground

The Ethniki Organosis Kyprion Agoniston (EOKA /eɪˈoʊkə/; Greek: Εθνική Οργάνωσις Κυπρίων Αγωνιστών, lit. 'National Organisation of Cypriot Fighters') was a Greek Cypriot nationalist guerrilla organization that fought a campaign for the end of British rule in Cyprus, and for eventual union with Greece. (Note: More specific, EOKA is the acronym of the organisation's full name in Greek, Εθνική Οργάνωσις Κυπρίων Αγωνιστών, Ethniki Organosis Kyprion Agoniston (National Organisation of Cypriot Fighters), sometimes expanded as Εθνική Οργάνωσις Κυπριακού Αγώνος, Ethnikí Orgánosis Kipriakoú Agónos ("National Organisation of Cypriot Struggle").)

== Background ==
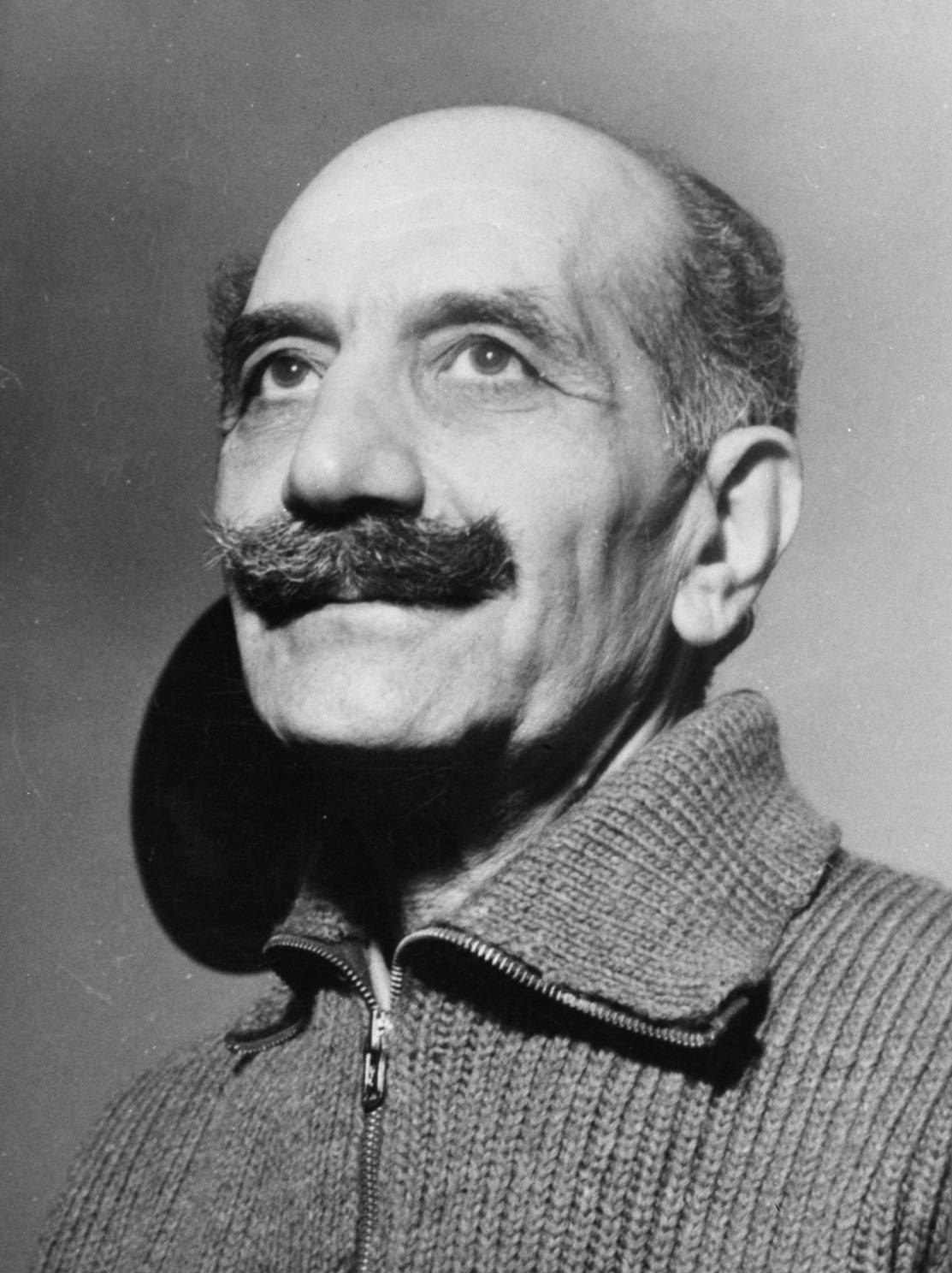
George Grivas

Cyprus, an island in the Eastern Mediterranean, has had a Greek cultural presence dating back thousands of years, visible in its language, religion, and traditions. The island was conquered by the Ottoman Empire in 1571. Before this, it had never been under Turkish rule, having been governed at different times by Greek, Byzantine, and Latin powers. During Ottoman administration, the population remained overwhelmingly Greek. Following the Russo-Turkish War (1877–1878), control of Cyprus was transferred to the British Empire on 4 June 1878. Official censuses conducted under British administration recorded a consistent Greek Cypriot majority: in 1881 Greeks numbered 137,631 (73.9%) and Turks 45,458 (24.4%) out of 186,173; in 1931 Greeks 276,572 (79.5%) and Turks 64,238 (18.5%) out of 347,959; and in 1960 Greeks 442,363 (77.1%) and Turks 104,333 (18.2%) out of 573,566.

British censuses conducted between 1881 and 1960 consistently recorded Greek Cypriots as the large majority of the population, with Turkish Cypriots forming a smaller minority:

Population of Cyprus by ethnic group (British censuses, 1881–1960)
Year	Total population	Greek Cypriots	%	Turkish Cypriots	%	Others	%
1881	186,173	137,631	73.9	45,458	24.4	3,084	1.7
1891	209,286	158,563	75.8	49,099	23.5	1,624	0.7
1901	237,022	178,148	75.2	54,465	23.0	4,409	1.9
1911	274,108	213,385	77.9	57,458	21.0	3,265	1.2
1921	310,709	246,399	79.3	61,851	19.9	2,459	0.8
1931	347,959	276,572	79.5	64,238	18.5	7,149	2.0
1946	450,114	369,565	82.1	80,548	17.9	1	0.0
1960	573,566	442,363	77.1	104,333	18.2	26,870	4.7

As nationalistic tendencies grew in both major population groups, Greek Cypriots advocated for Enosis (Union with Greece) which was a part of the Megali idea. The origins of Enosis date back to 1821, the year when the Greek War of Independence commenced, and the archbishop of Cyprus, his archdeacon, and three bishops were beheaded by the Ottoman colonial administration, amongst other atrocities. In 1828, Ioannis Kapodistrias, the first governor of Greece, asked for the union of Cyprus with Greece, while small-scale uprisings also occurred. In 1878, when British general Wolsely came to Cyprus to formally establish British rule, he was met by the archbishop of Kition who, after welcoming him, requested that Britain cede Cyprus to Greece. Initially, the Greek Cypriots welcomed British rule, as they were aware that the British had returned the Ionian Islands to Greece in 1864. They were also hopeful for British investment in Cyprus, which the Ottoman occupation left as an impoverished island.

In 1912, the British government made an offer to Greece to exchange Cyprus for a naval base in Argostoli, in order to gain control of the Ionian Sea, an offer which was repeated in 1913. In 1915, the British offered Cyprus to Greece several times in exchange for Greece's participation in World War I. While Greece was undecided whether it should enter the War, however, the British government withdrew its offer. By 1915, the Greek Cypriots' opposition to British rule had increased, seeing that neither the British investment nor Enosis had materialized. In the beginning, the Enosis movement had only few supporters, mainly from the upper classes. However, that was about to change as two groups, disappointed with the new ruler, began to form, namely the Church and the Usurers. A number of Cypriots studying in Greece in the following years became strong advocates of Enosis upon their return. On the other hand, the Turkish Cypriot community started to develop its own nationalism in the early 20th century, as news arrived in the island about the persecutions faced by Muslims in the countries that formed after the collapse of Ottoman Empire.

The November 1926 appointment of Ronald Storrs (a philhellene) as the new governor of Cyprus, fostered the idea among Greek Cypriot nationalists that British rule would be a stepping stone for the eventual union with Greece. Their relationship was to sour in 1928, when Greek Cypriots refused to take part in the celebration of the 50th anniversary of the British occupation of Cyprus. Greece appealed for calm, limiting the spread of anti-colonial articles in Greek Cypriot newspapers. Education became another arena of conflict with the passage of the Education Act, which sought to curtail Greek influence in the Cypriot school curricula. Cypriot irredentists also lamented the supposedly preferential treatment of Malta and Egypt at the expense of Cyprus. Relations worsened further when the British authorities unilaterally passed a new penal code which permitted among other things the use of torture. In 1929, Legislative Council members Archbishop of Kition Nikodemos and Stavros Stavrinakis arrived in London, presenting a memorandum to the secretary of colonies Lord Passfield which contained demands for Enosis. As with previous such attempts the answer was negative.

In September 1931, Storrs blocked a Legislative Council decision to halt tax hikes that were to cover a local budget deficit. Greek Cypriot MPs reacted by resigning from their positions. Furthermore, on 18 October, Archbishop of Kition Nikodemos called Greek Cypriots to engage in acts of civil disobedience until their demands for Enosis were fulfilled. On 21 October 1931, 5,000 Greek Cypriots, mostly students, priests and city notables rallied in the streets of Nicosia while chanting pro–Enosis slogans in what came to be known as the October Events. The crowd besieged Government House, following three hours of stone throwing the building was set on fire. The rioters were eventually dispersed by police. At the same time British flags were stripped from public offices across the country, often being substituted with Greek ones. Order was restored by the beginning of November. A total of seven protesters were killed, thirty were injured, ten were exiled for life, while 2,606 received various punishments ranging from prison terms to fines on account of seditious activities.

The revolt damaged both the Enotic cause and the Anglo–Hellenic relations. The Legislative Council and municipal elections were abolished, the appointment of village authorities and district judges was relegated to the governor of the island. Propagating Enotic ideas and flying foreign flags was banned as was the assembly of more than 5 people. Cyprus thus entered a period of autocratic rule known as Palmerokratia (Παλμεροκρατία; lit. 'Palmerocracy'), named after governor Richmond Palmer, which started shortly before the revolt and would last until the beginning of World War II.

In the 1950s, EOKA was established with the specific aim of mounting a military campaign to end the status of Cyprus as a British crown colony and achieving the island's unification with Greece. The leadership of AKEL at the time, the island's communist party, opposed EOKA's military action, advocating a "Gandhiesque approach" of civil disobedience, such as workers' strikes and demonstrations.

Initially, the struggle was political, as opposed to military. EOKA, in Grivas' words, wanted to attract the attention of the world through high-profile operations that would make headlines.

== Formation ==
=== Leadership ===
EOKA was headed by Georgios Grivas, a Greek Army officer (From Cyprus), World War I and World War II veteran. During the Axis occupation of Greece in World War II, he led a small, anti-nazi and anti-communist resistance (Note: There is some controversy surrounding the Xhi organization as some sources consider it or its members to be Nazi collaborators while others consider it patriotic and anti-communist) group, named Organization X. During the anti-communist struggle of December 1944 in Athens after the Axis withdrawal he was saved due to British intervention. Grivas assumed the nom de guerre Digenis in direct reference to the legendary Byzantine Digenis Akritas who repelled invaders from the Byzantine Empire. Second in command in EOKA was Grigoris Afxentiou, also a former officer of the Greek army. Afxentiou had graduated from the reserves Officers Academy in 1950 without previous experience on battlefield.

=== Objectives ===
The main objective of EOKA was liberation from British rule and further on, Enosis. The organization adopted Greek national ideologies and displayed religious, conservative and anticommunist ideas. This was in agreement with the prevailing ideas of Cypriot society at the time. There was a widespread belief that leftists opposed national objectives and provided a certain support to the colonial regime contrary to other contemporary anti-colonial insurgencies in Africa or Asia, which were led by Marxists.

Grivas and Archbishop Makarios III disagreed about the way to rid the island of British rule. Grivas rejected Makarios' attempt to limit the campaign to acts of sabotage, avoiding loss of life. Nevertheless, he shared Makarios' view that victory would be won by diplomatic means. Grivas' goal was to subject the British to continued relentless harassment, making it clear to them that occupation carried a price, while keeping Enosis on the international diplomatic agenda. The British response to the EOKA campaign was crucial in this regard: repression would on the one hand alienate the Greek Cypriot population from British rule, and on the other hand provide Makarios and the Greek government with a stick to beat the British with before the United Nations. EOKA would ensure that there was a Cyprus problem and demonstrate to the world that the British could not resolve it.

=== Preparations ===
Grivas carried out a first reconnaissance in Cyprus as early as July 1951. Makarios was certainly skeptical, telling Grivas on one occasion that he would not find supporters for an armed struggle. The British shared the same view. Grivas finally arrived on the island in early November 1954 and set about establishing his underground network. He recruited from the Cyprus Farmers' Union (PEK) in the villages and from the two main youth movements, the Church-controlled Christian Youth Movement (OHEN) and the nationalist Pancyprian Youth Movement (PEON) in the towns. Grivas intended to turn the youth of Cyprus 'into the seedbed of EOKA'. The backbone of EOKA were the mountain groups, a conventional guerrilla force living in hidden camps in the forests, and the town groups, often continuing their civilian job or schooling. Supporting this armed wing was the much broader National Front of Cyprus (EMAK), which provided EOKA with intelligence, supplies, weapons, medicines, recruits and safe houses, confronted the British on the streets with demonstrations and riots and conducted the propaganda offensive.

=== ANE ===
ANE (Greek: Άλκιμος Νεολαία ΕΟΚΑ – "Alkimos Neolaia EOKA", lit. 'Alkimos Youth EOKA') was the EOKA youth movement during the struggle for enosis between 1955 and 1959. The youth organisation had a self-governing body that was directly responsible to the leader of EOKA, Digenis. Among its activities was demonstrating against the British rule in Cyprus.

== Armed campaign ==
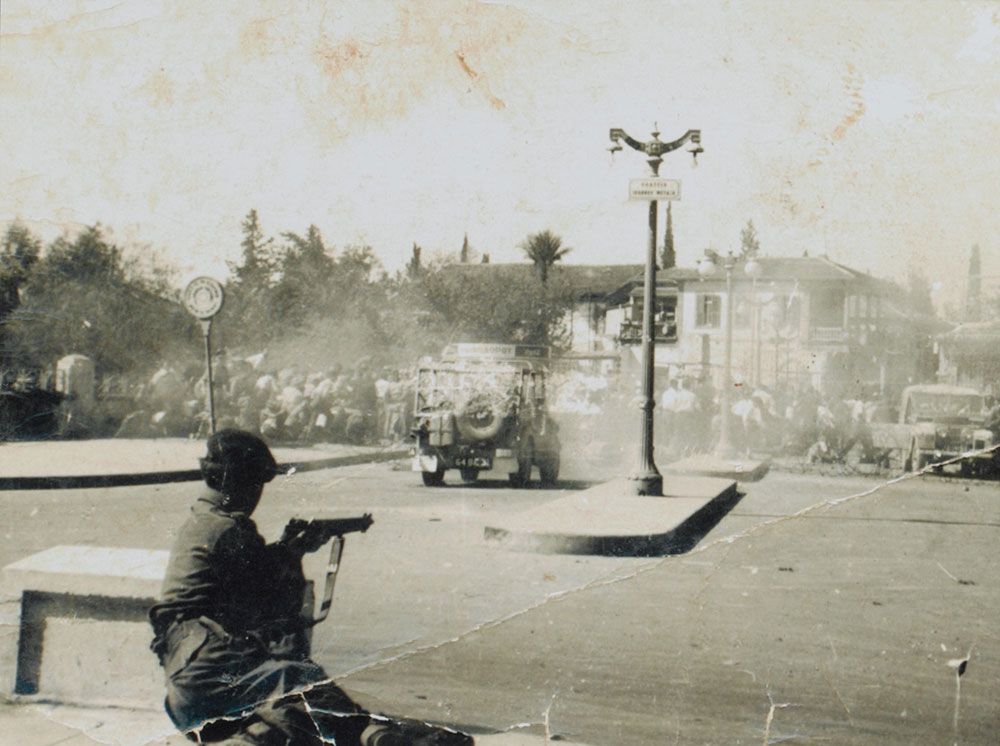
A British soldier facing a crowd of demonstrators during the Battle at Nicosia Hospital in 1956

=== From April 1955 to the dismissal of governor Armitage (October) ===
The armed struggle started 30 minutes after midnight on 31 March to 1 April 1955. A total of 18 bomb attacks occurred in various locations across the island. Most notable incidents were those of Nicosia by the group of Markos Drakos as well as the demolition of the Cyprus Broadcasting Station's transmitter. The attacks were accompanied by a revolutionary proclamation signed by "The leader, Digenes". Grivas decided to keep his involvement secret at the moment and used the name of a Byzantine general who had defended Cyprus in the medieval era. Grivas also prohibited attacks on the Turkish Cypriots at the time, and only wanted British soldiers and Greek collaborators to be targeted. The British, not expecting this turn of events, reinforced their local military bases (Dhekelia and Akrotiri) by transferring troops from Egypt.

At the end of April EOKA attacks temporarily paused, giving time to Grivas to organize the youth. A second offensive was launched on 19 June with coordinated bomb and grenade attacks against police stations, military installations and the homes of army officers and senior officials. One of those bombings demolished the building of the Famagusta Police headquarters. Those attacks were usually followed by sporadic incidents: shootings, bombings and increased public disorder. This second wave of EOKA attacks lasted until the end of June, totaling 204 attacks since the beginning of the armed resistance.

In August, two Special Branch members were assassinated in separate incidents. The raising of the Greek flag during demonstrations usually led to clashes with the colonial authorities, the latter removing it by force if necessary. Another major EOKA success was the escape from Kyrenia castle prison of 16 EOKA members including a number of key figures, such as Markos Drakos and Grigoris Afxentiou.

==== British reactions ====
The situation seemed to be deteriorating out of control and the British authorities attempted to safeguard their position in Cyprus by diplomatic maneuvering and a counterinsurgency offensive. The first involved playing the Greek and Turkish governments off against each other. Eden saw Turkey as "the key protecting British interests" in Cyprus. By the end of September, as the crisis was escalating, the British Government decided to replace governor Armitage. Then, British policy also aimed at the dramatic increase in recruitment of Turkish Cypriots. By the start of 1956, they had come to dominate the police force numbering 4,000 compared to less than 1,000 Greek Cypriots. The Turkish Cypriots were very much in the front line against EOKA. Inevitably, the use of Turkish Cypriot policemen against the Greek Cypriot community exacerbated relations between the two communities.

==== Turkish reactions ====
In August 1955, Adnan Menderes, the then Turkish prime minister, announced that Turkey would not accept any changes in the status of Cyprus that were not in Turkey's interests. In Turkey, public opinion was inflamed. Rumours spread in Turkish media that a slaughter of the Turkish Cypriot community was likely to occur; these were not totally unfounded, for in that June there had been a huge bomb explosion in the Turkish section of Nicosia, and Turkish Cypriot community leader Fazil Kucuk began receiving death threats. The increased tensions led to nationalist reactions in the country and the government-sponsored anti-Greek Istanbul pogrom of September 1955. At the same time, during the London Trilateral Conference between Britain, Turkey, and Greece, an agreement failed to materialize due to Turkish concerns that what Greece meant by self-determination was an eventual annexation. During a meeting between the end of August and 7 September 1955, Turkey also argued that if the status of Cyprus under a British administration would not be respected, the whole Treaty of Lausanne would be questionable.

=== From October 1955 to March 1956 (Operation Forward Victory, phase I) ===
The new British governor John Harding arrived at 3 October. Harding sought to meet Archbishop Makarios, and both agreed on commencing what became known as Harding-Makarios negotiations. Increased security and stepping up military might was of Harding's priorities. On 26 November, Harding declared a State of Emergency – that meant, amongst other things, implementation of the death penalty for non-fatality crimes. Repressive legislation and troop reinforcements did not succeed. The Greek Cypriot population was hostile and the Special Branch was neutered. The British response was large-scale cordon and search operations which rarely resulted in arrests or the discovery of arms caches, but which invariably alienated those whose houses were searched or who were roughed up and dragged off to be screened. Collective punishments, far from undermining support for EOKA, only succeeded in making the Greek Cypriots more hostile to British rule. Moreover, Harding viewed Cyprus very much as a pawn in the Cold War global situation: on 13 December he banned AKEL and detained 128 of its leading members, effectively crippling the only political party in Cyprus that opposed EOKA.

The inevitable result was to increase sympathy for EOKA and to assist its recruitment efforts. The problem was that the Greek Cypriot community was overwhelmingly in favour of Enosis. Far from moderates emerging with whom Britain could do a deal. It was this popular support, enabling Grivas and his small band of guerrillas to take on the growing security apparatus that Harding was marshaling against him, that sustained the armed struggle. It became clear that EOKA did have an effective intelligence apparatus and that the guerrillas were often forewarned of security intentions. Schoolchildren, domestic servants, civilian personnel on the military bases, the police, all were enlisted by Grivas in the intelligence war while the security forces were operating in the dark.

Operation "Forward to Victory" (Greek name) was launched on 18 November and was accompanied by several bomb attacks. In the urban areas, schoolchildren had a prominent role in the EOKA struggle. The Battle of Flags, escalated during the Autumn of 1955 and peaked in January and February 1956– that kept British forces busy away from chasing down EOKA. Schoolboys were not only participating in riots and stone-throwing against the police, but some of them were also trained to throw bombs and carry assassinations. Bombs by guerrillas and youngsters were thrown at British personnel houses, police stations and army camps. In some cases, EOKA members managed to steal some weaponry. The British were never to succeed completely eliminating EOKA agents from the police force.

The struggle continued in the mountains as the guerrillas expanded their network in the Troodos mountains. However, due to harsh winter conditions in addition to certain British military pressure, the activity of EOKA temporarily eased. By the end of February 1956 the British were involved in suppressing a veritable schoolchildren revolt that left one boy shot dead and the island's school system almost completely closed down.

=== March 1956 to March 1957 (Operation Victory, phase II) ===
After the failure of Makarios-Harding negotiations the British government abruptly exiled Makarios to Seychelles on 9 March 1956. This triggered a week long general strike followed by a dramatic increase in EOKA activity: 246 attacks until 31 March including an unsuccessful attempt to assassinate Harding. The offensive continued into April and May and the British casualties averaged two killed every week. While Harding's forces were making ground up in the mountains, EOKA guerrillas and youth were trying to assassinate members of the security forces at their leisure time or alleged traitors.

EOKA focused its activity to urban areas during this period. House bombings and riots, mostly by schoolboys, forced army to keep forces away from the mountains where EOKA's main fighters were hiding. Apart from individual citizens or soldiers in their leisure time, army and police facilities were attacked totaling 104 house bombings, 53 riots, 136 acts of Sabotage, 403 ambushes, 35 attacks on police, 38 attacks on soldiers and 43 raids on police stations. (Note: Some of the attacks of the attacks against civilians drew world attention and were used for propaganda purposes by the British authorities. Most notable attacks have been the killing of an army doctor while driving home, the execution of Greek Cypriot Assistant Superintendent Kyriacos Aristotelous, the killing of the son of a soldier in a beach near Dekelia base a Maltese shop owner (fiance of a Greek Cypriot woman) was killed by shooting in the back. -the photo of the grieving wife reached mainstream media in UK- another couple, a British customs officer and his wife, was murdered while picnicked. On 16 June 1956, the bombing of a restaurant by EOKA led to the death of William P. Boteler, a CIA officer working under diplomatic cover. Grivas immediately issued a statement denying a deliberate attempt to target American citizens.) But as the pressure of Harding mounted, Grivas began targeting Turkish Cypriot policemen effectively sparking inter-communal riots and a series of strikes.

Harding escalated his fight against EOKA organizing a series of operations in April–July (Note: These operations have been a) Operation ‘Kennett’b) Operation ‘Pepperpot’, c) Operation ‘Lucky Alphonse’ and d)Operation ‘Spread Eagle’. 21 soldiers died at a forest fire during Lucky Alphonse) Harding also upgraded his intelligence network including the creation of the notorious X-platoon. On 10 May the first two EOKA prisoners were hanged and Grivas responded with the execution of two British soldiers. The British were concerned to counter EOKA's mountain units. Large scale operations were launched however Grivas managed to escape. He decided to move to Limassol where he established his new headquarters. Although Grivas escaped, the Troodos operations had some success for the British: 20 guerrillas and 50 weapons were captured. However, they ended up with a disaster: at least 7 British soldiers were killed and additionally 21 were burned to death by accident. The last incident overshadowed the first real success against the EOKA guerrilla forces.

On 9 August the British authorities hanged three more EOKA prisoners; however, Grivas did not retaliate this time. Widespread strikes were held in protest. In November 1956 due to the Suez Crisis large numbers of British troops were transferred off Cyprus allowing Grivas to launch a new offensive. EOKA launched a wave of attacks in what would become for the British "Black November" with a total of 416 attacks, 39 killed, 21 of them British. After the Suez debacle, the British military strength was increased to 20,000 and Harding managed to direct a new offensive.

Although EOKA activity was severely suppressed in the mountains its armed struggle continued in the urban areas while the British forces were apparently impotent. Grivas declared truce on 14 March 1957 which lasted nearly one year.

=== From March 1957 to November 1957 ===
Harding continued to pressure EOKA despite the unilateral truce imposing security measures on villagers. This backfired at the British Forces as EOKA made gains in the field of propaganda.

Meanwhile, PEKA (Note: PEKA was the political branch of EOKA) was continuing the struggle for Enosis with political means, while EOKA was trying to recruit new members. Priests and teachers, under strict secrecy, were the scouting for young men aged 14–24, and were mostly successful. Grivas reorganized EOKA's structure. By Autumn, Grivas was increasing his autonomy from Greece and Makarios and was planning to attack the Left and the Turkish Cypriot community. The Greek government and Makarios were unable to prevent those initiatives.

==== Detention Camps and claims of torture ====
Detention of Persons Law, passed on 15 June 1955, gave the authority to the British authorities to enclose a suspect in a detention camp without a trial. PEKA and later Makarios and Greek Government pointed to the inhumane conditions in those camps. The situation of the inmates there was a matter of dispute. The International Committee of the Red Cross visited the camps twice and found no problems. Harding declined the torture allegations, describing it as propaganda by EOKA. Torture allegations had an impact in internal British politics. The precise use of torture methods remains a matter of dispute. According to Heinz Richter, while police or army was generally lawful, the British turned a blind eye to interrogators many of whom were deliberately under-educated Turkish Cypriots who were against Enosis. Another aspect that Richter highlights is that many claims of torture were made as the alleged victims were afraid for their lives as it was punished by death to speak to the British. David French on the other hand views that most – but not all – claims of torture were a propaganda tool of EOKA. In general Harding failed to win over the Greek Cypriot population especially when his security forces resorted to these measures.

Torture employed by the British in Cyprus included beatings, public floggings, clean beatings, forced standing, ice and drugs. Other torture included anal and vaginal insertion of hot eggs, a tactic also employed by the British in Kenya. A British Special Branch interrogator in Cyprus stated that he had devised the "hot egg under the armpit technique". In a few instances electrotorture was also applied. Jack Taylor, a British policeman who was sent to Cyprus in September 1956 revealed that there were beatings of prisoners, while Brigadier Michael Harbottle confirmed that the Special Branch in Cyprus used torture. These statements confirm the use of torture in Cyprus by the British, although how widespread and frequent its use was remains unclear.

==== Campaign against Greek Cypriot groups ====
Initially, EOKA was intimidating the population not to co-operate with the security forces, but steadily the definition of traitor broadened as the security forces had some successes against EOKA at the end of 1956. EOKA members who had spoken to the security forces under interrogation were also considered as traitors and Grivas was in favour of the death penalty in such cases. Incidences happened where EOKA guerrillas killed others by their own initiative and not solely based on accusations for treason. The killings took place in public. Such activity peaked especially during summer-autumn 1956. The Greek Cypriot Left and in particular the communist party (AKEL) were also targeted. The latter aimed at a political role in the Greek Cypriot community challenging EOKA's claim that Makarios was the sole leader of the community. As AKEL was growing in numbers it was practically denying Makarios' role. The British delicately fueled this hostility and in August 1957 a second wave of intra-Greek violence broke out. Another similar wave broke out in April–October 1958 when a peace agreement was imminent. AKEL held massive demonstrations and sought the help of Makarios which he granted. A number of scholars characterize EOKA as a terrorist organization due to attacks on public utilities, assassination of members of the security forces, civil servants and intimidation methods towards local population and targeting civilians.

==== End of truce ====
During this period the British were openly tolerating the Turkish Cypriot paramilitary organisations. The British had deliberately set out to use the Turkish Cypriot community on the island and the Turks government as a means of blocking the demand for Enosis. They had effectively allied themselves with the Turkish minority and turned them as the overwhelming majority in the police force. This had now got out of control as far as the British were concerned, but nevertheless they still managed to exploit the situation.

The truce against the colonial authorities lasted until 28 October 1957 (Ohi Day, Greek national holiday) when Harold Macmillan, British minister of foreign affairs, declined a proposal by Makarios.

=== December 1957 – August 1958 (Foot governorship and intercommunal violence) ===
Sir Hugh Foot arrived in Cyprus in December 1956, when it was obvious that a military victory for the British was not imminent. Grivas at that time was planning a gradual escalation of EOKA's attacks on the British forces but in mid-December, he called for a truce to give space for negotiations to take place. The truce broke on 4 March 1958 when a new wave of attacks was unleashed but this time, Grivas ordered his guerrillas not to attack Turkish Cypriots to avoid intercommunal violence that could lead to partition.

==== EOKA and Turkish Cypriots ====
The Turkish Cypriot community objected to Enosis long before the 1950s from fear that unification with Greece would lead to their persecution and expulsion, a fear based on the fate of Cretan Turks after Crete's union with Greece. Similarly, nationalism among Turkish Cypriots was constructed from various events that led to the dissolution of the Ottoman Empire. Grass root paramilitary armed groups, such as Kıbrıs Türk Mukavemet Birliği ("Turkish Cypriot Resistance Unit"), Kara Çete ("Black Gang") and Volkan, appeared as early as May 1955. All of them were absorbed later by TMT (Türk Mukavemet Teşkilatı/Turkish Resistance Organization). TMT was Turkey's tool to fuel intercommunal violence in order to show that partition was the only possible arrangement. Like EOKA, TMT used violence against members of its own community (i.e. leftists) that were not willing to stay in line with their cause.

EOKA avoided conflict against the Turkish Cypriots but this changed later from January 1957. According to French, Grivas decided to attack Turkish Cypriots so as to spark intercommunal tensions and rioting in the towns of Cyprus, forcing the British to withdraw their troops from hunting EOKA up in the mountains and restore order in urban areas. From 19 January 1957 to the end of March, EOKA's guerrillas attacked members of the Turkish community, starting with a Turkish Cypriot police officer, sparking riots lasting 3 days.

Intercommunal (and intra-communal) violence escalated in the summer of 1958 with numerous fatalities. French counted 55 assassinations by Turks on Greeks, and 59 assassinations by Greeks on Turks between 7 June-7 August. A substantial number of Turkish Cypriots were displaced due to the violence. In order to tackle the intercommunal clash, Foot mounted Operations "Matchbox" and "Table Lighter". A truce was called in August, backed by the Greek and Turkish Governments.

=== From August 1958 to the Zurich and London Agreements ===
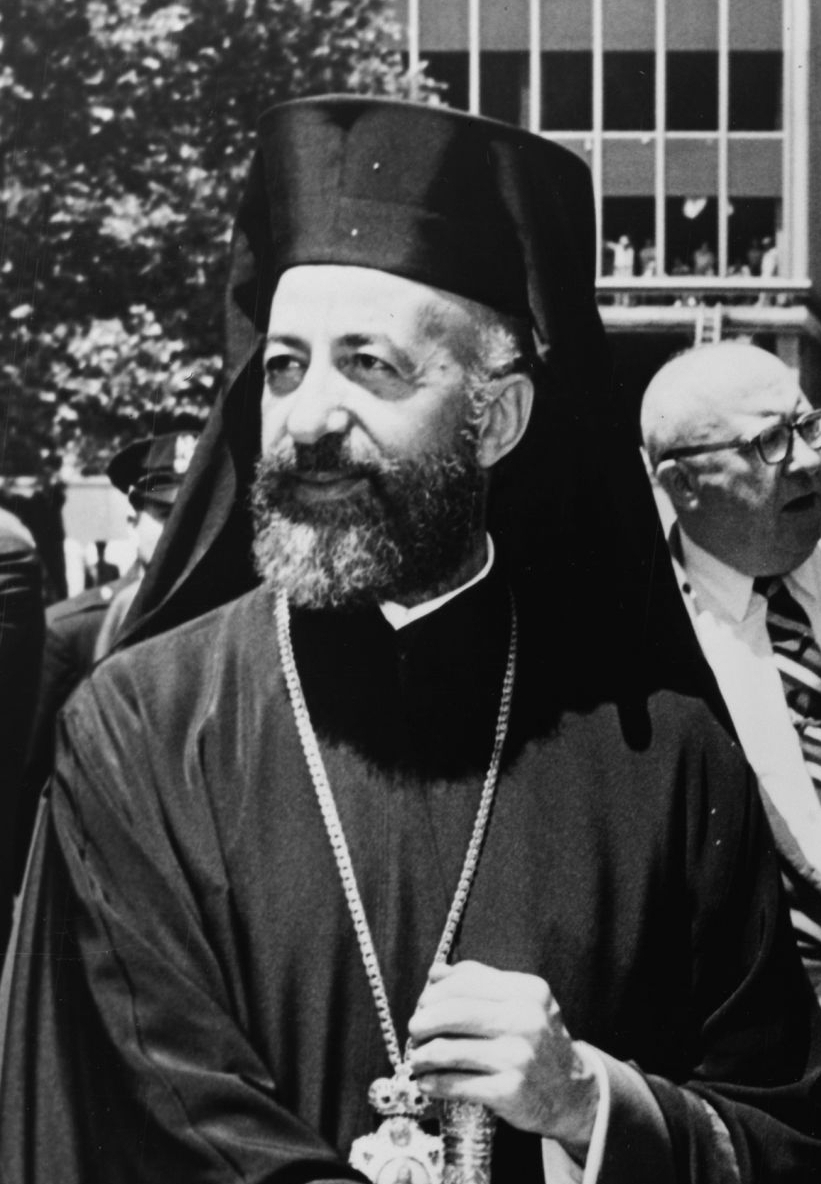
Archbishop Makarios III (here in 1962) was the political leader of EOKA.

British authorities were unable to suppress EOKA activity, so the British government was trying to reach a solution that would not embarrass Britain. The MacMillan Plan put an effort in this direction. Greeks rejected the plan as they saw it as an open door leading to the partition of the island and Grivas cancelled the truce on 7 September. A new armed campaign was launched and the targets differed significantly from the previous periods. Grivas ordered guerrillas to "strike indiscriminately at every English person wherever they can be found" resulting in the death of 8 British citizens in 104 incidents attacks in the following two months. But while the military force of EOKA was growing, Greek Cypriots were getting frustrated from the intercommunal violence and the struggle against the British. Makarios hinted in an interview that he was ready to shift his stance and accept an independent Cyprus. This development infuriated Grivas but was backed by influential members of the Greek Cypriot Community. EOKA was losing its broad support base.

During the last months of 1958, all parties had reasons to favour a compromise. Greek Cypriot side was afraid that partition was becoming more and more imminent, Greece was anxious that the ongoing situation could lead to a war with Turkey, Turkey had to manage the ongoing crises at its eastern borders and the British did not want to see NATO destabilizing because of Greek-Turkish war. On 5 December, the foreign ministers of Greece and Turkey acknowledged the situation and a series of meetings were arranged that resulted in London-Zürich Agreements. This was a compromise solution in which Cyprus would become an independent and sovereign country. Both Makarios and Grivas accepted the agreements with a heavy heart, but Turkish-Cypriot leadership was enthusiastic about the compromise. On 9 March 1959, Grivas issued a leaflet declaring his acceptance to London agreements.

According to historian Heinz Richter, the activities of EOKA resulted in the death of 104 British soldiers, 54 policemen (among them 15 Greek Cypriots, 22 Turkish Cypriots and 12 British) and 238 citizens (among them 26 British, 203 Greek Cypriots and 7 Turkish Cypriots)

== Aftermath ==
After Zurich-London agreement and the establishment of the Republic of Cyprus, Makarios, who became the first president, staffed the Government and Civil service with EOKA members. Extremists of both communities stayed armed and continued to seek their ends, Enosis or Taksim. Ministers and other EOKA veterans joined the secret Akritas organisation, with Polycarpos Giorkatzis as new "Digenis". As each community strived for opposite ends, the newly formed state soon collapsed, after Makarios changed the constitution unilaterally, paving the way to the intercommunal violence.

=== Museums and Monuments ===
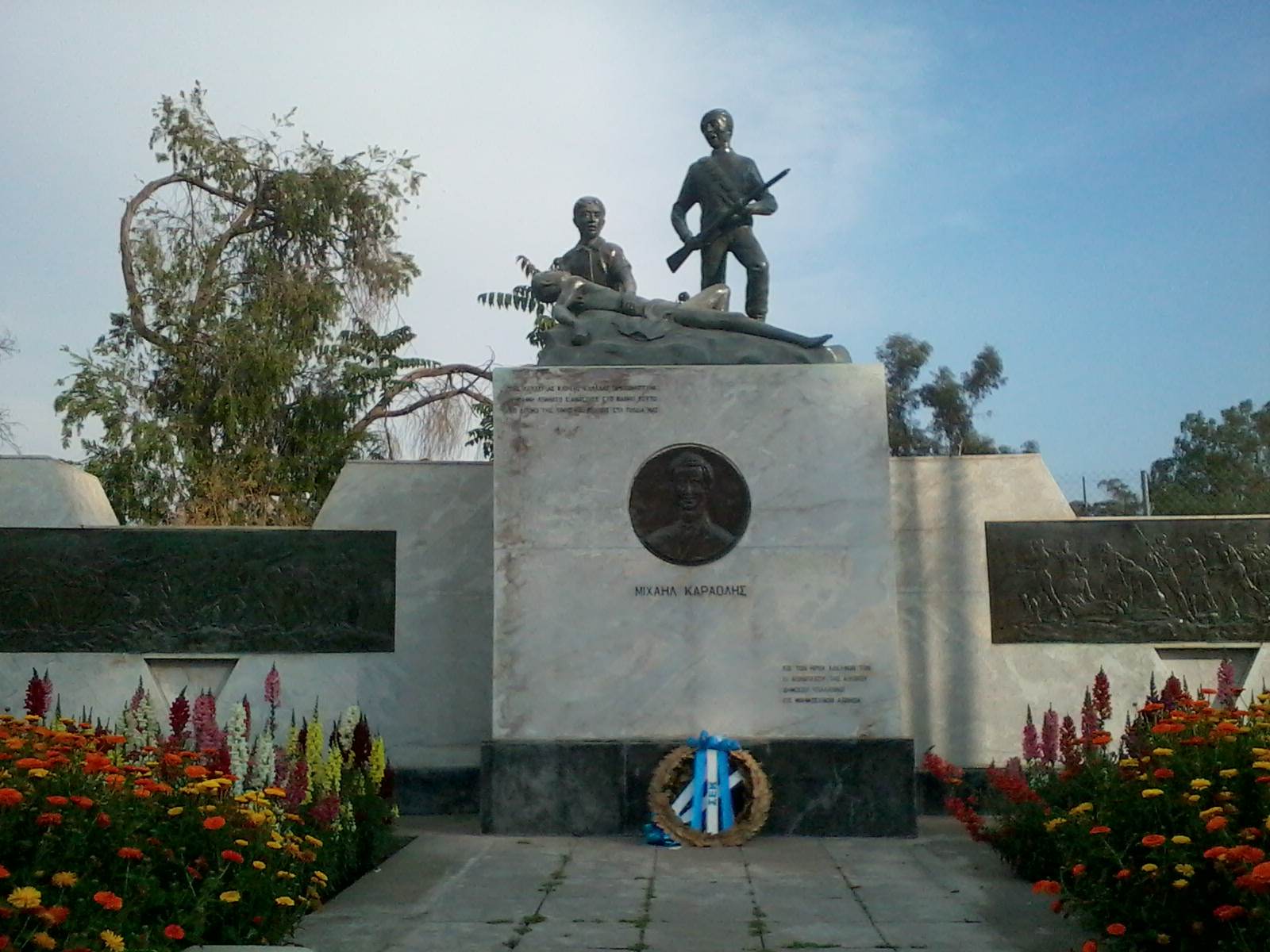
Monument for Michalis Karaolis, Nicosia

A memorial museum dedicated to the EOKA campaign was created in 1960. It is located in the centre of Nicosia.

There are various monuments dedicated to the members of EOKA who died during the years of combat who are largely regarded as war-time heroes by Greek-Cypriots. Part of the central jail of Nicosia established by British governor Harding functions after the Cypriot independence as a museum. This includes the prisons cells, the gallows and the "Incarcerated Graves" of 13 EOKA fighters who were either executed or killed by the colonial authorities.

== Foreign Office declassified documents and EOKA lawsuits against the British government ==
In 2012, Foreign Office released highly classified documents that described claims of torture and abuse between 1955–1959. In the reports it is revealed that officials of the colonial administration admitted to torture and abuse. In the same papers, there are allegations against British soldiers and security personnel concerning (among other incidents) the killing of a blind man, ordering a Greek Cypriot to dig his own grave, and hitting a pregnant woman who subsequently miscarried. Other allegations include the 1958 mass arrest and beating of 300 civilians by colonial forces. In the incident, it was alleged that the force involved left some civilians behind, thinking they were dead. A woman also alleged that she was raped in a forest, at the age of 16, by members of the Special Branch, and was subsequently subject to a "brutal interrogation" regarding her connection to EOKA which included a mock execution and forcibly wearing a noose. In another incident, a man lost his kidney following an interrogation at the notorious "Red House" building in Limassol.

Following the release of the documents, EOKA veterans announced that lawsuits were being planned against British authorities. The veterans association alleged that at least 14 Cypriots died and hundreds more could have been tortured during interrogations by the British during the 1955–1959 campaign. Two of those who allegedly died during interrogation were aged 17. The legal action comes on the back of the uncovering of secret documents released in 2011 which present similar practices during the Mau Mau Uprising in Kenya, during the same period.

In 2018, Cypriot veterans won the right to claim damages over UK torture claims at court. The presiding judge dismissed arguments by the British government that the case should be judged under Cypriot law, which, if true, would have meant that the statute of limitations applied in the case. The judge commented that "It seems to me that, in this case at any rate, where a state stands to be held to account for acts of violence against its citizens, it should be held to account in its own courts, by its own law and should not escape liability by reference to a colonial law it has itself made."

The case was settled out-of-court with the UK awarding Greek Cypriots with £1 million (to be distributed among alleged victims). The UK government denied any liability.

Declassified British archives have also revealed that the Information Research Department (IRD), a secret propaganda wing of the UK Foreign Office which dealt with Cold War propaganda, was responsible for spreading fake news claiming that EOKA rebels had raped schoolgirls as young as 12 years old. These black propaganda stories were spread to American journalists as a part of "Operation TEA-PARTY".

== In popular culture ==
In Cyprus the EOKA struggle has, since its end, become a near mythological organisation due to its surprising victory and the motility from the Cypriot people of the then unborn nation for independence, and as such, there has been a plethora of movies, TV series and documentaries to the present day. EOKA has also been in British movies and documentaries but in antithesis, the approach of both being sympathetic to the British forces on the island and portraying EOKA as a terrorist organisation.

Cyprus:

- Μπροστα στην αγχονη - In front of the gallows (1968 movie)
- Μουσείον Αγώνος - Αφιέρωμα - Museum of the Struggle - Dedication (1983 documentary)
- Η γυναίκα της Κύπρου στον αγώνα της ΕΟΚΑ - The woman of Cyprus in the EOKA struggle (1991 documentary)
- Ο Γαμπρός της Λευτεριάς - The Βridegroom of Freedom (1995 TV movie)
- Κύπρος Ο Απελευθεροτικός Αγώνας της ΕΟΚΑ 1956-1957 - Cyprus, the liberation struggle of EOKA 1956-1957 (1996 documentary)

United Kingdom:

- One morning near Trοodes (1956)
- Incident at Echo Six (1959)
- The Interrogator (1961)
- Private Potter (1962)
- The High Bright Sun (1965)
- An act of reprisal (1965)
- The Private Right (1966)
- Cyprus: Britain's Grim Legacy (1984 documentary)

In Media:

The EOKA pistol is an early game weapon in the video game Rust

== Legacy ==
The authorities of the Republic of Cyprus consider the EOKA struggle as a struggle of national liberation and its members as heroic freedom fighters. The day of the beginning of the EOKA campaign, 1 April, is considered a national anniversary in the country today. Turkish narrative as written in a Turkish-Cypriot textbook considers the struggle of EOKA's guerrillas as barbaric and illegal with the conclusion that "Cyprus is and will remain Turkish" (p. 61)."

== Equipment ==
=== SMG ===
- STEN
- Beretta M1938

== See also ==
- EOKA B
- Grigoris Afxentiou
- Evagoras Pallikarides
- Markos Drakos
- Michalis Karaolis
- Nikos Sampson
- Battle of Spilia
- Field Marshal Harding
- Migrated archives

== Sources ==
Sources in Greek

- Βαρνάβα, Αντρέας (2000). Η νεολαία στον απελευθερωτικό αγώνα της ΕΟΚΑ. Συμβούλιο Ιστορικής Μνήμης ΕΟΚΑ.
- Θρασυβούλου, Μάριος (2016). Ο εθνικισμός των Ελληνοκυπρίων, από την αποικιοκρατία στην Ανεξαρτησία. Θεσσαλονίκη: επίκεντρο. ISBN 978-960-458-686-8.
- Κτωρής, Σώτος (2013). Τουρκοκύπριοι: από το περιθώριο στο συνεταιρισμό, 1923-196. Αθήνα: Παπαζήσης. ISBN 9789600228984.
- Richter, Heinz (2007). Ιστορία της Κύπρου, τόμος πρώτος (1878-1949). Αθήνα: Εστία. ISBN 9789600512946. translated from the original Heinz Richter (2006). Geschichte der Insel Zypern. Harrassowitz Verlag. ISBN 978-3-447-05975-6.
- Richter, Heinz (2011). Ιστορία της Κύπρου, τόμος δεύτερος(1950-1959). Αθήνα: Εστία.

Sources in English

- Abrahms, Max; Lula, Karolina (2012). "Why Terrorists Overestimate the Odds of Victory". Perspectives on Terrorism. 6 (4/5): 46–62. JSTOR 26296876.
- Beaton, Roderick (2003). George Seferis: Waiting for the Angel : a Biography. Yale University Press. ISBN 978-0-300-10135-5.
- Bellingeri, Giampiero; Kappler, T. (2005). Cipro oggi. Casa editrice il Ponte. ISBN 978-88-89465-07-3.
- Crenshaw, Martha; Pimlott, John (22 April 2015). "Terrorism in Cyprus". International Encyclopedia of Terrorism. Routledge. ISBN 978-1-135-91966-5.
- Cronin, Audrey Kurth (24 August 2009). "Chapter 3: Success, Achieving the objective". How Terrorism Ends: Understanding the Decline and Demise of Terrorist Campaigns. Princeton University Press. pp. 73–93. ISBN 978-1-4008-3114-2.
- Drousiotis, Makarios (25 April 2005). "Our Haunted Country". Politis Newspaper.
- Edwards, Aaron (28 February 2018). "Securing the base: Fighting EOKA terrorists in Cyprus". Defending the Realm? The politics of Britain's small wars since 1945. Manchester University Press. pp. 126–151. doi:10.7765/9781526129956.00010. ISBN 9781526129956.
- French, David (2015). Fighting EOKA: The British Counter-Insurgency Campaign on Cyprus, 1955-1959. Oxford University Press. ISBN 978-0-19-872934-1.
- Frendo, Henry (1998). "The naughty European twins of empire: The constitutional breakdown in Malta and Cyprus 1930–1933". The European Legacy: Toward New Paradigms. 3 (1): 45–52. doi:10.1080/10848779808579863.
- Emerick, Keith (2014). Conserving and Managing Ancient Monuments: Heritage, Democracy, and Inclusion. Boydell & Brewer Ltd. ISBN 978-1-84383-909-5.
- Ganser, Daniele (2005). Nato's Secret Armies: Operation Gladio and Terrorism in Western Europe. Routledge. p. 213. ISBN 978-0-7146-5607-6.
- Holland, Robert (26 November 1998). Britain and the Revolt in Cyprus, 1954-1959. Clarendon Press. ISBN 978-0-19-820538-8.
- Hadjistylianou, Michalis; Giorgos Ploutarhos (2005). "Οι δύο όψεις της ιστορίας για τους εκτελεσθέντες (The two views on the assassinations)". Simerini (in Greek). Archived from the original on 25 February 2008.
- Hazou, Elias (12 April 2005). "Christofias comments spark EOKA storm". Cyprus Mail.
- Isachenko, Daria (20 March 2012). The Making of Informal States: Statebuilding in Northern Cyprus and Transdniestria. Palgrave Macmillan. ISBN 9780230360594.
- Karyos, Andreas (2009). "EOKA and Enosis in 1955-59: Motive and Aspiration Reconsidered" (PDF). London School of Economics. Archived from the original (PDF) on 29 March 2017.
- Kraemer, Joseph S. (Winter 1971). "Revolutionary Guerrilla Warfare & the Decolonization Movement". Polity. 4 (2): 137–158. doi:10.2307/3234160. JSTOR 3234160. S2CID 155657462.
- Kizilgurek, Niyazi (1999). "National memory and Turkish-Cypriot textbooks". Internationale Schulbuchforschung. 21 (4): 387–395. JSTOR 43056308.
- Kizilyurek, Niyazi (2011). "The politics of identity in the Turkish Cypriot community: a response to the politics of denial?". Persée (in French).
- Klapsis, Antonis (2009). "Between the Hammer and the Anvil. The Cyprus Question and the Greek Foreign Policy from the Treaty of Lausanne to the 1931 Revolt". Modern Greek Studies Yearbook. 24: 127–140.
- Mallinson, William; Mallinson, Bill (22 July 2005). Cyprus: A Modern History. I.B.Tauris. ISBN 978-1-85043-580-8.
- Markides, Kyriakos C. (1974). "social change and the rise and decline of social movements: the case of Cyprus1". American Ethnologist. 1 (2). Wiley: 309–330. doi:10.1525/ae.1974.1.2.02a00070. ISSN 0094-0496.
- Lange, Matthew (12 December 2011). Educations in Ethnic Violence: Identity, Educational Bubbles, and Resource Mobilization. Cambridge University Press. ISBN 9781139505444.
- Newsinger, John (30 April 2016). British Counterinsurgency. Palgrave Macmillan. ISBN 978-1-137-31686-8.
- Novo, Andrew R. (2010). On all fronts: EOKA and the Cyprus insurgency, 1955-1959 (PhD thesis). University of Oxford.
- Novo, Andrew R. (2012). "Friend or foe? The Cyprus Police Force and the EOKA insurgency". Small Wars & Insurgencies. 23 (3). Informa UK Limited: 414–431. doi:10.1080/09592318.2012.661609. ISSN 0959-2318. S2CID 144663807.
- Papadakis, Yiannis (1998). "Greek Cypriot Narratives of History and Collective Identity: Nationalism as a Contested Process". American Ethnologist. 25 (2). Wiley: 149–165. doi:10.1525/ae.1998.25.2.149. ISSN 0094-0496.
- Rappas, Alexis (2008). "The Elusive Polity: Imagining and Contesting Colonial Authority in Cyprus During the 1930s". Journal of Modern Greek Studies. 26 (2): 363–393. doi:10.1353/mgs.0.0020. S2CID 145799982.
- Richter, Heinz A. (2010). A Concise History of Modern Cyprus. Harrassowitz Verlag. ISBN 978-3447062121.
- Sherratt, Susan; Bennett, John (30 November 2016). Archaeology and the Homeric Epic. Oxbow Books. ISBN 978-1-78570-298-3.
- S. Corum, James (2006). "Training Indigenous Forces in Counterinsurgency: A Tale of Two Insurgencies" (PDF). Strategic Studies Institute. U.S. Army War College. Archived from the original (PDF) on 25 July 2006.
- "EOKA". Encyclopædia Britannica. Encyclopædia Britannica, inc. 2015.
