= 1993–94 Cypriot Third Division =

Cypriot Third Division
- Season: 1993–94
- Champions: Othellos Athienou FC (2nd title)
- Promoted: Othellos Athienou FC
- Relegated: Adonis Idaliou; APEY Ypsona; AEK Kakopetrias; ENTHOI Lakatamia FC; Livadiakos Livadion

The 1993–94 Cypriot Third Division was the 23rd season of the Cypriot third-level football league. Othellos Athienou FC won their 1st title.

== Format ==
Fourteen teams participated in the 1993–94 Cypriot Third Division. All teams played against each other twice, once at their home and once away. The team with the most points at the end of the season crowned champions. The first team were promoted to 1994–95 Cypriot Second Division. The last five teams were relegated to the 1994–95 Cypriot Fourth Division.

The 2nd-placed team faced the 9th-placed team of the 1993–94 Cypriot Second Division, in a two-legged relegation play-off for one spot in the 1994–95 Cypriot Second Division. The 9th-placed team faced the 2nd-placed team of the 1993–94 Cypriot Fourth Division, in a two-legged relegation play-off for one spot in the 1994–95 Cypriot Third Division.

=== Point system ===
Teams received three points for a win, one point for a draw and zero points for a loss.

== League standings ==
Pos	Team	Pld	W	D	L	GF	GA	GD	Pts	Promotion or relegation
1	Othellos Athienou FC	26	–	–	–	45	18	+27	48	Promoted to 1994–95 Cypriot Second Division
2	Achyronas Liopetriou	26	–	–	–	50	31	+19	45	Promotion playoff
3	Ayia Napa FC	26	–	–	–	59	39	+20	42	
4	AEK Katholiki	26	–	–	–	40	27	+13	39	
5	Digenis Akritas Morphou FC	26	–	–	–	37	31	+6	39	
6	Tsaggaris Peledriou	26	–	–	–	40	39	+1	39	
7	Ethnikos Latsion FC	26	–	–	–	52	50	+2	38	
8	Digenis Akritas Ipsona	26	–	–	–	28	40	−12	38	
9	Fotiakos Frenarou	26	–	–	–	35	29	+6	36	Relegation playoff
10	Adonis Idaliou	26	–	–	–	33	34	−1	34	Relegated to 1994–95 Cypriot Fourth Division
11	APEY Ypsona	26	–	–	–	33	46	−13	33	Relegated to 1994–95 Cypriot Fourth Division
12	AEK Kakopetrias	26	–	–	–	34	41	−7	29	Relegated to 1994–95 Cypriot Fourth Division
13	ENTHOI Lakatamia FC	26	–	–	–	28	33	−5	26	Relegated to 1994–95 Cypriot Fourth Division
14	Livadiakos Livadion	26	–	–	–	16	72	−56	12	Relegated to 1994–95 Cypriot Fourth Division

Rules for classification: 1) Points, 2) Goal differences, 3) Goal for

== Promotion playoff ==
- Achyronas Liopetriou 1 – 2 Doxa Katokopias FC
- Doxa Katokopias FC 4 – 1 Achyronas Liopetriou

== Relegation playoff ==
- Rotsidis Mammari 2 – 1 Fotiakos Frenarou
- Fotiakos Frenarou 1 – 0 Rotsidis Mammari

== Sources ==
- "Η Μόρφου ζει και αναπνέει". Phileleftheros (in Greek). 1994-05-09. p. 13.

== See also ==
- Cypriot Third Division
- 1993–94 Cypriot First Division
- 1993–94 Cypriot Cup
