= 1993–94 Cypriot Second Division =

Cypriot Second Division
- Season: 1993–94
- Champions: Aris (3rd title)
- Promoted: Aris
- Relegated: Orfeas; Ermis; APEP; Chalkanoras; Ethnikos
- Matches played: 182
- Goals scored: 481 (2.64 per match)

The 1993–94 Cypriot Second Division was the 39th season of the Cypriot second-level football league. Aris won their 3rd title.

== Format ==
Fourteen teams participated in the 1993–94 Cypriot Second Division. All teams played against each other twice, once at their home and once away. The team with the most points at the end of the season crowned champions. The first team were promoted to 1994–95 Cypriot First Division. The last five teams were relegated to the 1994–95 Cypriot Third Division.

The 2nd-placed team faced the 11th-placed team of the 1993–94 Cypriot First Division, in a two-legged relegation play-off for one spot in the 1994–95 Cypriot First Division. The 9th-placed team faced the 2nd-placed team of the 1993–94 Cypriot Third Division, in a two-legged relegation play-off for one spot in the 1994–95 Cypriot Second Division.

== Changes from previous season ==
Teams promoted to 1993–94 Cypriot First Division

- Omonia Aradippou
- APEP

Teams relegated from 1992–93 Cypriot First Division

- Aris Limassol
- APOP Paphos

Teams promoted from 1992–93 Cypriot Third Division

- AEZ Zakakiou
- Ermis Aradippou

Teams relegated to 1993–94 Cypriot Third Division

- Digenis Akritas Morphou
- THOI Lakatamia

== League standings ==
| Pos | Team | Pld | W | D | L | GF | GA | GD | Pts | Promotion or relegation |
|---|---|---|---|---|---|---|---|---|---|---|
| 1 | Aris Limassol (C, P) | 26 | 16 | 8 | 2 | 50 | 14 | +36 | 56 | Promoted to Cypriot First Division |
| 2 | APOP Paphos | 26 | 14 | 7 | 5 | 48 | 27 | +21 | 49 | Qualification for promotion play-off |
| 3 | Alki Larnaca | 26 | 12 | 8 | 6 | 53 | 28 | +25 | 44 | |
| 4 | AEZ Zakakiou | 26 | 10 | 9 | 7 | 28 | 31 | −3 | 39 | |
| 5 | Akritas Chlorakas | 26 | 10 | 7 | 9 | 31 | 35 | −4 | 37 | |
| 6 | PAEEK FC | 26 | 8 | 11 | 7 | 44 | 36 | +8 | 35 | |
| 7 | Onisilos Sotira | 26 | 9 | 8 | 9 | 38 | 31 | +7 | 35 | |
| 8 | Anagennisi Deryneia | 26 | 9 | 8 | 9 | 35 | 29 | +6 | 35 | |
| 9 | Doxa Katokopias (O) | 26 | 8 | 10 | 8 | 26 | 33 | −7 | 34 | Qualification for relegation play-off |
| 10 | Orfeas Nicosia (R) | 26 | 7 | 11 | 8 | 37 | 37 | 0 | 32 | Relegated to Cypriot Third Division |
| 11 | Ermis Aradippou (R) | 26 | 8 | 6 | 12 | 31 | 37 | −6 | 30 | Relegated to Cypriot Third Division |
| 12 | APEP Pelendriou (R) | 26 | 8 | 6 | 12 | 22 | 34 | −12 | 30 | Relegated to Cypriot Third Division |
| 13 | Chalkanoras Idaliou (R) | 26 | 5 | 10 | 11 | 24 | 49 | −25 | 25 | Relegated to Cypriot Third Division |
| 14 | Ethnikos Assia (R) | 26 | 0 | 7 | 19 | 14 | 60 | −46 | 7 | Relegated to Cypriot Third Division |

Rules for classification: 1) Points, 2) Goal differences, 3) Goal for. Points system: Won=3 points, Drawn=1 point, Lost=0 points.
(C) Champions; (O) Play-off winners; (P) Promoted; (R) Relegated

== Playoff ==
=== Promotion playoff ===
The 2nd-placed team, APOP Paphos, faced the 11th-placed team of the 1993–94 Cypriot First Division, Olympiakos Nicosia, in a two-legged relegation play-off for one spot in the 1994–95 Cypriot First Division. Olympiakos won both matches and secured their place in the 1994–95 Cypriot First Division.

- APOP 2–3 Olympiakos
- Olympiakos 2–0 APOP

=== Relegation playoff ===
The 9th-placed team, Doxa Katokopias, faced the 2nd-placed team of the 1993–94 Cypriot Third Division, Achyronas Liopetriou, in a two-legged relegation play-off for one spot in the 1994–95 Cypriot Second Division. Doxa won both matches and secured their place in the 1994–95 Cypriot Second Division.

- Achyronas Liopetriou 1–2 Doxa
- Doxa 4–1 Achyronas Liopetriou

== See also ==
- Cypriot Second Division
- 1993–94 Cypriot First Division
- 1993–94 Cypriot Cup

== Sources ==
- "1993/94 Cypriot Second Division". Rec.Sport.Soccer Statistics Foundation. 2016-01-14.
