= 1993–94 Cypriot Cup =

Tournament details
- Country: Cyprus
- Dates: 1 December 1993 – 28 May 1994
- Teams: 50

Final positions
- Champions: Omonia (10th title)

The 1993–94 Cypriot Cup was the 52nd edition of the Cypriot Cup. A total of 50 clubs entered the competition. It began on 1 December 1993 with the first preliminary round and concluded on 28 May 1994 with the final which was held at Tsirion Stadium. Omonia won their 10th Cypriot Cup trophy after beating Anorthosis 1–0 in the final after extra time.

== Format ==
In the 1993–94 Cypriot Cup, participated all the teams of the Cypriot First Division, the Cypriot Second Division, the Cypriot Third Division and 8 of the 14 teams of the Cypriot Fourth Division.

The competition consisted of six knock-out rounds. In the preliminary round and in the first round each tie was played as a single leg and was held at the home ground of one of the two teams, according to the draw results. Each tie winner was qualifying to the next round. If a match was drawn, extra time was following. If extra time was drawn, there was a replay at the ground of the team who were away for the first game. If the rematch was also drawn, then extra time was following and if the match remained drawn after extra time the winner was decided by penalty shoot-out.

The next three rounds were played in a two-legged format, each team playing a home and an away match against their opponent. The team which scored more goals on aggregate, was qualifying to the next round. If the two teams scored the same number of goals on aggregate, then the team which scored more goals away from home was advancing to the next round.

If both teams had scored the same number of home and away goals, then extra time was following after the end of the second leg match. If during the extra thirty minutes both teams had managed to score, but they had scored the same number of goals, then the team who scored the away goals was advancing to the next round (i.e. the team which was playing away). If there weren't scored any goals during extra time, the qualifying team was determined by penalty shoot-out.

The cup winner secured a place in the 1994–95 UEFA Cup Winners' Cup.

== Ρreliminary round ==
All the 14 clubs of the Cypriot Second Division, all the 14 clubs of the Cypriot Third Division and 8 clubs from the Cypriot Fourth Division (first eight of the league table the day of draw) participated in the preliminary round.

Team 1	Score	Team 2
Ayia Napa F.C. (C)	1–0	Akritas Chlorakas (B)
Adonis Idaliou (C)	0–1	Achyronas Liopetriou (C)
AEK Kakopetrias (C)	0–1	Aris Limassol F.C. (B)
AEK Katholiki (C)	0–4	Fotiakos Frenarou (C)
Anagennisi Deryneia (B)	4–1	APEY Ypsona (C)
APEP Pelendriou (B)	2–2, 0–4	Digenis Akritas Ipsona (C)
Chalkanoras Idaliou (B)	4–1	Ermis Aradippou (B)
Digenis Akritas Morphou (C)	1–0	ENTHOI Lakatamia FC (C)
Digenis Oroklinis (D)	2–1	Anagennisi Germasogeias (D)
Ethnikos Assia F.C. (B)	3–1	Apollon Lympion (D)
Ethnikos Defteras (D)	3–0	Livadiakos Livadion (C)
Ethnikos Latsion (C)	2–3	AEZ Zakakiou (B)
MEAP Nisou (D)	0–5	Alki Larnaca F.C. (B)
Onisilos Sotira (B)	6–0	Rotsidis Mammari (D)
Othellos Athienou F.C. (C)	1–0	APOP Paphos (B)
PAEEK FC (B)	0–1	Orfeas Nicosia (B)
Poseidonas Giolou (D)	1–2 (a.e.t.)	Elia Lythrodonta (D)
Tsaggaris Peledriou (C)	3–4 (a.e.t.)	Doxa Katokopias F.C. (B)

== First round ==
The 14 clubs of the Cypriot First Division advanced directly to the first round and met the winners of the preliminary round ties:

Team 1	Score	Team 2
Alki Larnaca F.C. (B)	1–0	Evagoras Paphos (A)
Anagennisi Deryneia (B)	0–2	Digenis Akritas Morphou (C)
APEP F.C. (A)	2–0	Digenis Oroklinis (D)
APOEL FC (A)	6–2	Chalkanoras Idaliou (B)
Apollon Limassol (A)	8–0	Achyronas Liopetriou (C)
Aris Limassol F.C. (B)	1–2	Olympiakos Nicosia (A)
Digenis Akritas Ipsona (C)	0–2	AEL Limassol (A)
Doxa Katokopias F.C. (B)	1–7	AC Omonia (A)
Enosis Neon Paralimni FC (A)	2–0	AEZ Zakakiou (B)
EPA Larnaca FC (A)	6–2	Elia Lythrodonta (D)
Ethnikos Assia F.C. (B)	0–4	Ethnikos Achna FC (A)
Ethnikos Defteras (D)	1–3	Anorthosis Famagusta FC (A)
Nea Salamis Famagusta FC (A)	1–0	Fotiakos Frenarou (C)
Omonia Aradippou (A)	4–0	Orfeas Nicosia (B)
Othellos Athienou F.C. (C)	5–0	Ayia Napa F.C. (C)
Pezoporikos Larnaca (A)	4–0	Onisilos Sotira (B)

== Second round ==
Team 1	Agg.	Team 2	1st leg	2nd leg
Alki Larnaca F.C. (B)	2–3	EPA Larnaca FC (A)	0–2	2–1
Anorthosis Famagusta FC (A)	1–0	Olympiakos Nicosia (A)	1–0	0–0
APEP F.C. (A)	0–8	Nea Salamis Famagusta FC (A)	0–2	0–6
APOEL FC (A)	8–1	Othellos Athienou F.C. (C)	3–0	5–1
Enosis Neon Paralimni FC (A)	2–2 (a)	Pezoporikos Larnaca (A)	1–0	1–2
Ethnikos Achna FC (A)	2–5	Apollon Limassol (A)	0–2	2–3
Omonia Aradippou (A)	2–1	Digenis Akritas Morphou (C)	1–0	1–1
AC Omonia (A)	3–0	AEL Limassol (A)	0–0	3–0

== Quarter-finals ==
Team 1	Agg.	Team 2	1st leg	2nd leg
APOEL FC (A)	8–3	Omonia Aradippou (A)	6–1	2–2
Enosis Neon Paralimni FC (A)	2–5	Anorthosis Famagusta FC (A)	1–2	1–3
Nea Salamis Famagusta FC (A)	4–1	EPA Larnaca FC (A)	2–1	2–0
AC Omonia (A)	5–2	Apollon Limassol (A)	5–1	0–1

== Semi-finals ==
Team 1	Agg.	Team 2	1st leg	2nd leg
APOEL FC (A)	2–5	Anorthosis Famagusta FC (A)	1–2	1–3
AC Omonia (A)	3–2	Nea Salamis Famagusta FC (A)	3–2	0–0

== Final ==
28 May 1994

Omonia	1–0 (a.e.t.)	Anorthosis

Tsirion Stadium, Limassol

Cypriot Cup 1993–94 Winners
Omonia
10th title

== Sources ==
- "1993/94 Cyprus Cup". Rec.Sport.Soccer Statistics Foundation. 2016-01-14.

== See also ==
- Cypriot Cup
- 1993–94 Cypriot First Division
