= Avgorou =

Avgorou: Αυγόρου (Greek); Avgoru (Turkish)
- Village
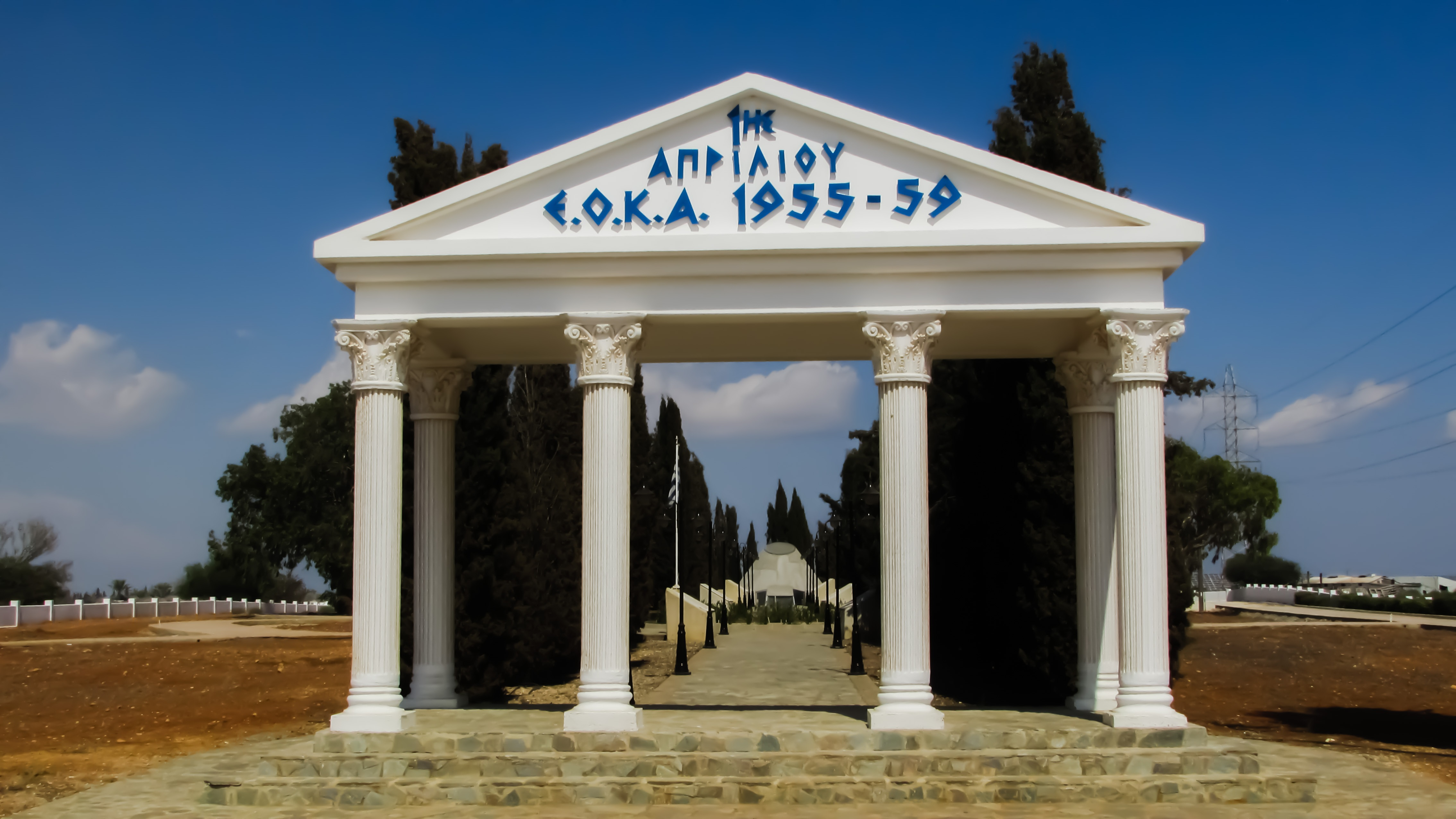
- EOKA Struggle (1955-1959) monument in Avgorou

- Location in Cyprus
- Coordinates: 35°2′8″N 33°50′21″E
- Country: Cyprus
- District: Famagusta District

Population (2011)
  - Total: 5,389
- Time zone: UTC+2 (EET)
  - Summer (DST): UTC+3 (EEST)

Avgorou (Greek: Αυγόρου, also spelled Αβγόρου, [locally [afˈkoɾu]]; Turkish: Avgoru) is a municipal district of the Municipality of Ayia Napa in southwestern Famagusta District, Cyprus. It is located near Frenaros, Sotira, Liopetri and Ormidia.

Avgorou is one of the bigger suburbs in Famagusta area. Approximately 40 meters above sea level, near the district of Larnaka – Famagusta, and about 6 km north from Xylofagou village. Avgorou is still connected with the old road to Nicosia and borders with Dasaki Axnas, Xylofagou, Ormidia and Liopetri.

The colour of the soil in Augorou is dark red and very fertile, making Avgorou one of the main agriculture and animal farming areas in Famagusta. Most citizens of Avgorou cultivate a variety of potatoes, breadstuffs like barley, carrots, vegetables, locust trees, olive trees and some fruit trees.

The population of Avgorou is circa 5000
