= 1994–95 Cypriot Cup =

Tournament details
- Country: Cyprus
- Dates: 2 November 1994 – 27 May 1995
- Teams: 52

Final positions
- Champions: APOEL (14th title)

The 1994–95 Cypriot Cup was the 53rd edition of the Cypriot Cup. A total of 52 clubs entered the competition. It began on 2 November 1994 with the preliminary round and concluded on 27 May 1995 with the final which was held at Tsirion Stadium. APOEL won their 14th Cypriot Cup trophy after beating Apollon 4–2 in the final.

== Format ==
In the 1994–95 Cypriot Cup, participated all the teams of the Cypriot First Division, the Cypriot Second Division, the Cypriot Third Division and 14 of the 15 teams of the Cypriot Fourth Division.

The competition consisted of six knock-out rounds. In the preliminary round and in the first round each tie was played as a single leg and was held at the home ground of one of the two teams, according to the draw results. Each tie winner was qualifying to the next round. If a match was drawn, extra time was following. If extra time was drawn, there was a replay at the ground of the team who were away for the first game. If the rematch was also drawn, then extra time was following and if the match remained drawn after extra time the winner was decided by penalty shoot-out.

The next three rounds were played in a two-legged format, each team playing a home and an away match against their opponent. The team which scored more goals on aggregate, was qualifying to the next round. If the two teams scored the same number of goals on aggregate, then the team which scored more goals away from home was advancing to the next round.

If both teams had scored the same number of home and away goals, then extra time was following after the end of the second leg match. If during the extra thirty minutes both teams had managed to score, but they had scored the same number of goals, then the team who scored the away goals was advancing to the next round (i.e. the team which was playing away). If there weren't scored any goals during extra time, the qualifying team was determined by penalty shoot-out.

The cup winner secured a place in the 1995–96 UEFA Cup Winners' Cup.

== Ρreliminary round ==
All the 11 clubs of the Cypriot Second Division, all the 14 clubs of the Cypriot Third Division and 14 clubs from the Cypriot Fourth Division (only MEAP – the last team of the league table the day of draw – did not participated) participated in the preliminary round.

Team 1	Score	Team 2
Achilleas Ayiou Theraponta (D)	2–1	Ermis Aradippou (C)
Adonis Idaliou (D)	1–4	Ethnikos Assia F.C. (C)
AEK Kakopetrias (D)	4–0	APEY Ypsona (D)
AEK Kythreas (D)	0–2	Alki Larnaca F.C. (B)
AEZ Zakakiou (B)	2–2, 1–2	APEP F.C. (B)
Akritas Chlorakas (B)	0–4	Evagoras Paphos (B)
Anagennisi Deryneia (B)	4–2	Ayia Napa F.C. (C)
Anagennisi Germasogeias (D)	4–0	Elia Lythrodonta (C)
Digenis Akritas Ipsona (C)	2–0	AEK Katholiki (C)
Digenis Akritas Morphou (C)	4–1	Apollon Lympion (D)
Ethnikos Defteras (D)	2–3	Chalkanoras Idaliou (C)
Ethnikos Latsion (C)	3–1	Fotiakos Frenarou (C)
Iraklis Gerolakkou (D)	0–1	Poseidonas Giolou (D)
Kinyras Empas (D)	3–0	APOP Paphos (B)
Onisilos Sotira (B)	5–3	Digenis Oroklinis (D)
Orfeas Nicosia (C)	2–0	Livadiakos Livadion (D)
Othellos Athienou F.C. (B)	3–2	ENTHOI Lakatamia FC (D)
PAEEK FC (B)	2–0	Achyronas Liopetriou (C)
Rotsidis Mammari (D)	3–1	APEP Pelendriou (C)
Tsaggaris Peledriou (C)	0–2	Doxa Katokopias F.C. (B)

== First round ==
The 12 clubs of the Cypriot First Division advanced directly to the first round and met the winners of the preliminary round ties:

Team 1	Score	Team 2
Achilleas Ayiou Theraponta (D)	2–1	Nea Salamis Famagusta FC (A)
AEK Larnaca F.C. (A)	4–0	Doxa Katokopias F.C. (B)
AEL Limassol (A)	10–2	Digenis Akritas Ipsona (C)
Anagennisi Germasogeias (D)	1–2	PAEEK FC (B)
Anorthosis Famagusta FC (A)	3–0	Chalkanoras Idaliou (C)
APEP F.C. (B)	5–1	Ethnikos Assia F.C. (C)
APOEL FC (A)	3–2	Kinyras Empas (D)
Apollon Limassol (A)	3–0	Rotsidis Mammari (D)
Digenis Akritas Morphou (C)	1–2	Enosis Neon Paralimni FC (A)
Ethnikos Achna FC (A)	1–0	Ethnikos Latsion (C)
Olympiakos Nicosia (A)	3–1	Orfeas Nicosia (C)
Omonia Aradippou (A)	10–0	AEK Kakopetrias (D)
AC Omonia (A)	7–0	Anagennisi Deryneia (B)
Onisilos Sotira (B)	0–5	Alki Larnaca F.C. (B)
Othellos Athienou F.C. (B)	0–3	Aris Limassol F.C. (A)
Poseidonas Giolou (D)	0–1	Evagoras Paphos (B)

== Second round ==
Team 1	Agg.	Team 2	1st leg	2nd leg
AEK Larnaca F.C. (A)	2–8	AC Omonia (A)	1–3	1–5
AEL Limassol (A)	8–3	Aris Limassol F.C. (A)	2–1	6–2
Alki Larnaca F.C. (B)	0–7	Apollon Limassol (A)	0–3	0–4
APOEL FC (A)	12–1	Achilleas Ayiou Theraponta (D)	11–0	1–1
APEP F.C. (B)	1–13	Anorthosis Famagusta FC (A)	1–5	0–8
Ethnikos Achna FC (A)	2–4	Olympiakos Nicosia (A)	1–2	1–2
Evagoras Paphos (B)	3–4	Omonia Aradippou (A)	1–1	2–3
PAEEK FC (B)	1–8	Enosis Neon Paralimni FC (A)	1–6	0–2

== Quarter-finals ==
Team 1	Agg.	Team 2	1st leg	2nd leg
AEL Limassol (A)	1–3	APOEL FC (A)	0–1	1–2
Anorthosis Famagusta FC (A)	0–4	Apollon Limassol (A)	0–0	0–4
Enosis Neon Paralimni FC (A)	5–3	Olympiakos Nicosia (A)	3–0	2–3
AC Omonia (A)	4–1	Omonia Aradippou (A)	0–0	4–1

== Semi-finals ==
Team 1	Agg.	Team 2	1st leg	2nd leg
Apollon Limassol (A)	2–1	Enosis Neon Paralimni FC (A)	2–1	0–0
AC Omonia (A)	1–3	APOEL FC (A)	0–2	1–1

== Final ==
27 May 1995

APOEL	4–2	Apollon
Pittas 26' (o.g.); Alexandrou 35', 73'; Sotiriou 70'		Špoljarić 6' (pen.); Pittas 52'

Tsirion Stadium, Limassol
Attendance: 16,000

Cypriot Cup 1994–95 Winners
APOEL
14th title

== Sources ==
- "1994/95 Cyprus Cup". Rec.Sport.Soccer Statistics Foundation. 2016-01-14.

== See also ==
- Cypriot Cup
- 1994–95 Cypriot First Division
