= Victoria Barracks, Belfast =

Military installation in Belfast, Northern Ireland

Victoria Barracks
- Belfast, Northern Ireland
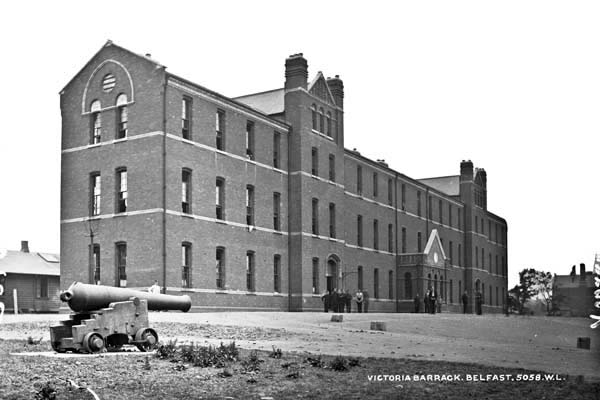
- Victoria Barracks, Belfast

Site information
- Type: Barracks
- Owner: Ministry of Defence
- Operator: British Army

Location
- Location within Northern Ireland
- Coordinates: 54.610°N 5.932°W

Site history
- Built: 1798
- Built for: War Office
- In use: 1798-early 1960s

Garrison information
- Garrison: Royal Irish Rifles

Victoria Barracks was a military installation in New Lodge, Belfast in Northern Ireland.

== History ==
The barracks were completed just before the Irish Rebellion in 1798. In 1873 a system of recruiting areas based on counties was instituted under the Cardwell Reforms and the barracks became the depot for the 83rd (County of Dublin) Regiment of Foot and the 86th (Royal County Down) Regiment of Foot. Following the Childers Reforms, the 83rd and 86th regiments amalgamated to form the Royal Irish Rifles with its depot in the barracks in 1881. A major extension was built between 1880 and 1881 to accommodate the extra troops.

The Royal Ulster Rifles moved to St Patrick's Barracks in 1937. The barracks were bombed and badly damaged by the Luftwaffe during the Second World War and fell into a complete state of disrepair in the 1950s before being finally demolished in the early 1960s. Some of the officers’ houses are still in use as private housing, the Sergeants’ Mess is now a social centre known as “the Recy” but most of the site is now occupied by the “Artillery Flats”.
