= 86th (Royal County Down) Regiment of Foot =

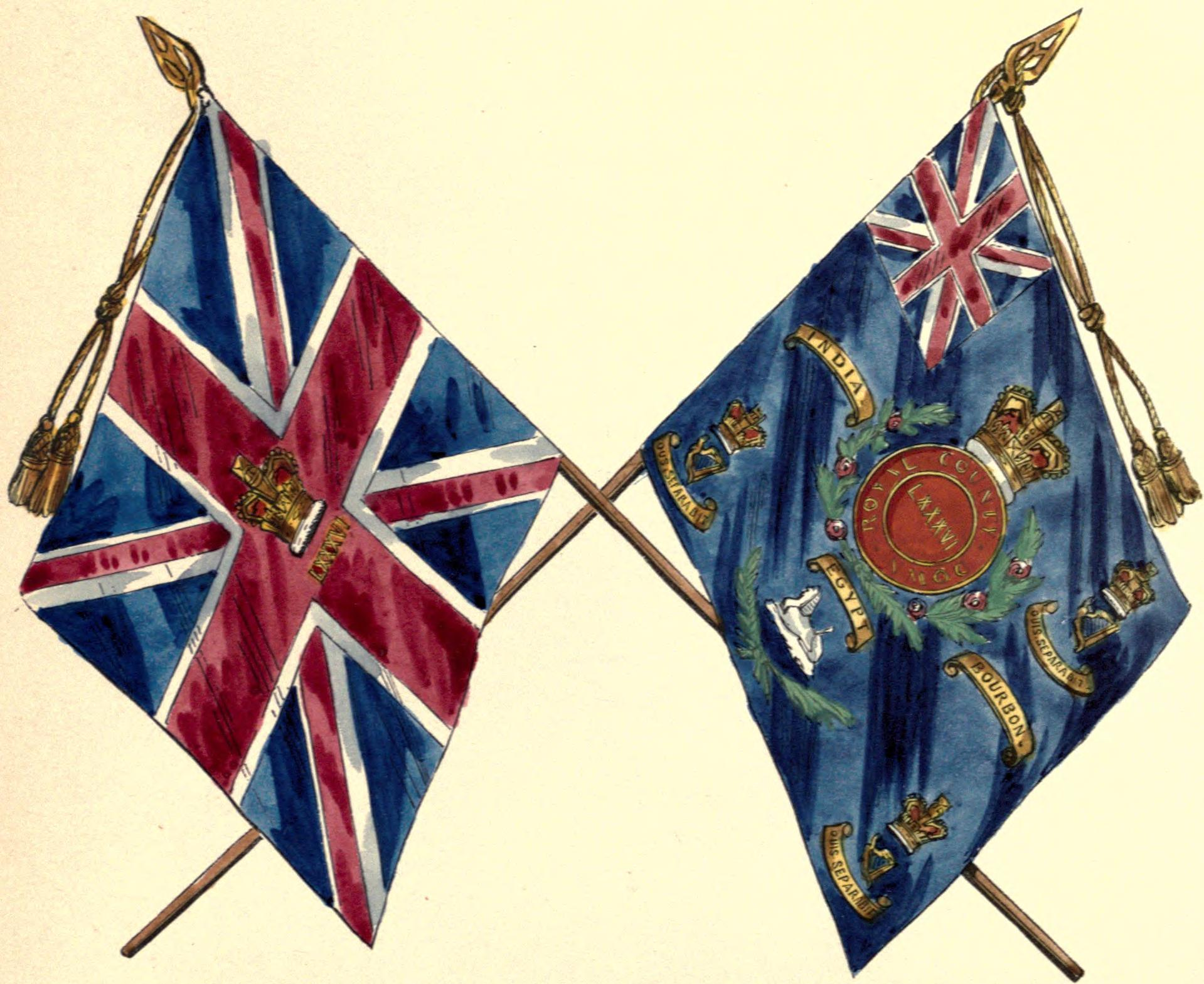
- Regimental colours
- Active: 1793–1881
- Country: Kingdom of Great Britain (1793–1800); United Kingdom of Great Britain and Ireland (1801–1881)
- Branch: British Army
- Type: Infantry
- Size: One battalion (two battalions 1813–1814)
- Garrison/HQ: Victoria Barracks, Belfast
- Engagements: French Revolutionary Wars; Second Anglo-Maratha War; Napoleonic Wars; Indian Rebellion

The 86th (Royal County Down) Regiment of Foot was an infantry regiment of the British Army, raised in 1793. Under the Childers Reforms it amalgamated with the 83rd (County of Dublin) Regiment of Foot to form the Royal Irish Rifles in 1881.

== History ==
=== Formation ===
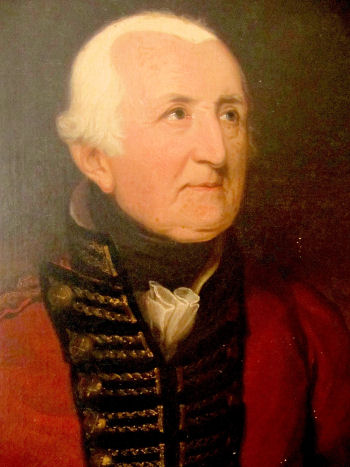
General Sir Cornelius Cuyler, founder of the regiment

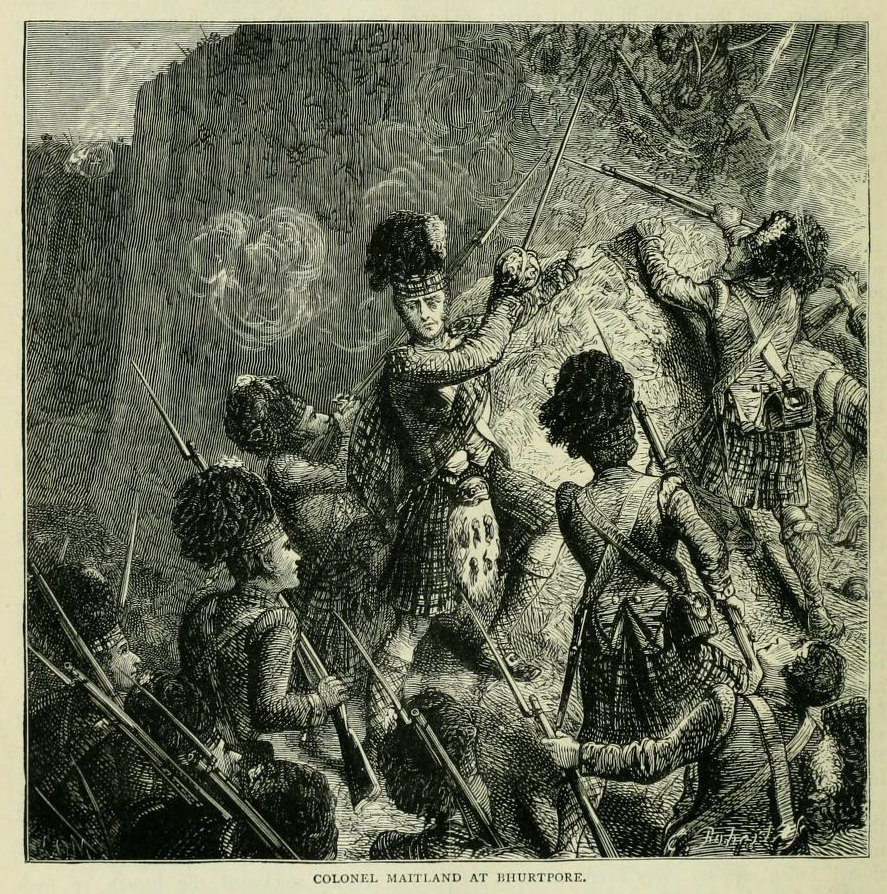
The Siege of Bharatpur in January 1805

The regiment was raised in Shropshire by Major-General Sir Cornelius Cuyler as Sir Cornelius Cuyler's Shropshire Volunteers, in response to the threat posed by the French Revolution, on 30 October 1793. It was absorbed into the British Army the following year as the 86th (Shropshire Volunteers). Serving as marines, the regiment embarked on ships in January 1795. The men took part in the Battle of Hyères Islands in July 1795. It absorbed the remnants of the disbanded 118th Regiment of Foot (Fingall's Regiment), which had been raised the previous year for service as marines, in October 1795.

The regiment embarked for the Cape of Good Hope arriving there in September 1796 with orders to consolidate the position in the colony following the surrender of Dutch Forces earlier that month. The regiment was dispatched to Maddras in India in February 1799 arriving there in May 1799. It then transferred to Bombay in July 1799. From there three companies were deployed to Ceylon in late 1800.

The regiment embarked for Egypt in April 1801 for service in the Egyptian Campaign. The regiment landed at Suez and following a long march across northern Egypt and the surrender of Cairo by the French Army in June 1801, the regiment occupied the citadel at Cairo. The regiment returned to Bombay in spring 1802 and then provided storming parties for two unsuccessful assaults at the Siege of Bharatpur in January 1805 during the Second Anglo-Maratha War. Twenty-five soldiers from the regiment were killed in the disastrous operation. The regiment returned to Bombay in March 1806 and immediately embarked for Goa. The regiment became the 86th (Leinster) Regiment of Foot in October 1809.

=== Napoleonic Wars ===
The regiment took part in the invasion of Isle Bonaparte in July 1810 and, following the invasion of Isle de France, was sent to occupy the colony in March 1811 before returning to Madras in February 1812. Having become the 86th (Royal County Down) Regiment of Foot in May 1812, the regiment moved to Hyderabad in January 1816, where it served in the Third Anglo-Maratha War. The regiment sailed for Trincomalee, British Ceylon in September 1818 where it took part in suppressing the Great Rebellion of 1817–1818 before embarking for Europe in April 1819.

=== The Victorian era ===
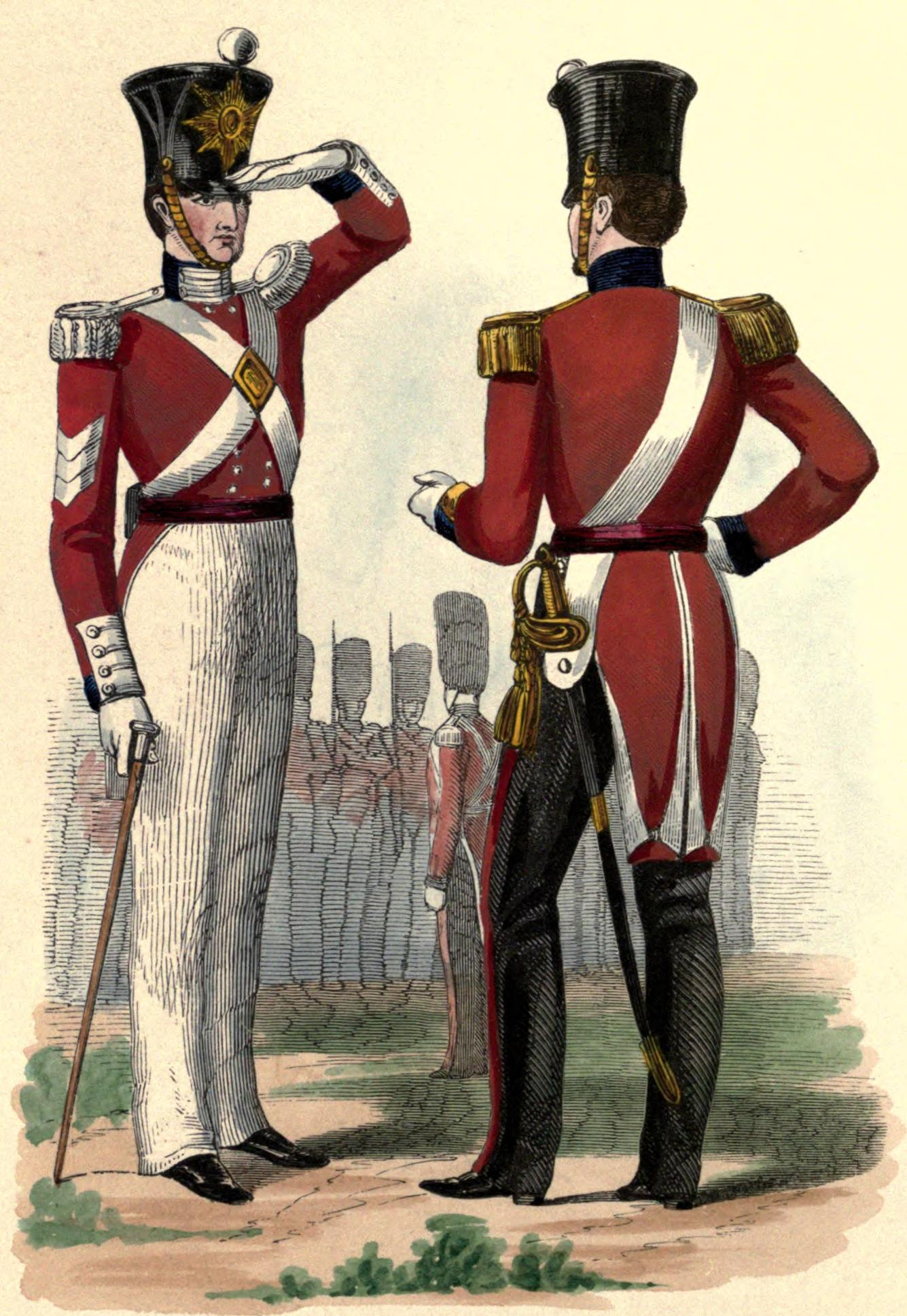
Regimental uniform, 1840s

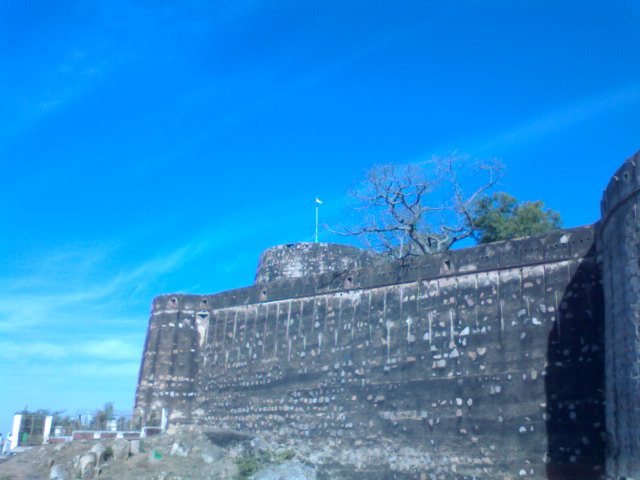
Jhansi Fort which the regiment besieged in April 1858

The regiment embarked for the West Indies in October 1826. It was initially based in Trinidad but moved to Barbados in January 1828, Antigua in January 1830 and Demerara and Berbice in February 1833. It embarked for home in March 1837. It returned to India in 1842 and saw action in Central India during the Indian Rebellion. It formed part of the force led by Major-General Sir Hugh Rose which besieged and captured Jhansi Fort in April 1858: four Victoria Crosses were awarded to members of the regiment for this operation. It returned home in August 1859 and was deployed to Gibraltar in 1864 and then went on to Mauritius in 1867 before returning to the Cape of Good Hope in 1870. It returned home in 1875 and then embarked for Bermuda in 1880.

As part of the Cardwell Reforms of the 1870s, where single-battalion regiments were linked together to share a single depot and recruiting district in the United Kingdom, the 86th was linked with the 83rd (County of Dublin) Regiment of Foot and assigned to district no. 63 at Victoria Barracks, Belfast. On 1 July 1881 the Childers Reforms came into effect and the regiment amalgamated with the 83rd (County of Dublin) Regiment of Foot to form the Royal Irish Rifles.

== Battle honours ==
Battle honours won by the regiment were:

- Egypt (sphinx superscribed "Egypt")
- India, Bourbon, Central India

== Victoria Cross recipients ==
- Captain Henry Edward Jerome - 1858, Jhansi (Indian Rebellion of 1857).
- Lieutenant Hugh Stewart Cochrane - 1858, Jhansi (Indian Rebellion of 1857).
- Private James Byrne - 1858, Jhansi (Indian Rebellion of 1857).
- Private James Pearson - 1858, Jhansi (Indian Rebellion of 1857).

== Colonels of the Regiment ==
Colonels of the Regiment were:

=== Sir Cornelius Cuyler's Shropshire Volunteers ===
- 1793–1794: Gen. Sir Cornelius Cuyler, Bt.

=== 86th (the Shropshire Volunteers) - (1794) ===
- 1794–1795: Gen. Russell Manners
- 1795–1803: Gen. William Grinfield
- 1804-1806: Gen. Sir James Henry Craig, KB

=== 86th (The Leinster) Regiment of Foot - (1806) ===
- 1806–1810: Lt-Gen. Sir Charles Ross, Bt.
- 1810–1832: Gen. Francis Needham, 1st Earl of Kilmorey

=== 86th (Royal County Down) Regiment of Foot - (1812) ===
- 1832–1835: Lt-Gen. William Harris, 2nd Baron Harris of Seringapatam and Mysore, CB, KCH
- 1835–1836: Maj-Gen. Hon. Sir Frederick Ponsonby, GCMG, KCB, KCH
- 1836–1837: Gen. Sir James Watson, KCB
- 1837–1843: Lt-Gen. Sir Arthur Brooke, KCB
- 1843–1852: Gen. John Maister
- 1852–1854: Maj-Gen. Roger Parke
- 1854–1862: Gen. Lord James Hay
- 1862–1881: F.M. Sir John Michel, GCB

== Sources ==
- Cannon, Richard (1842). Historical Record of the Eighty-Sixth, or Royal County Down Regiment of Foot. London: J. W. Parker.
