= James Byrne (VC) =

Irish recipient of the Victoria Cross (c. 1822–1872)

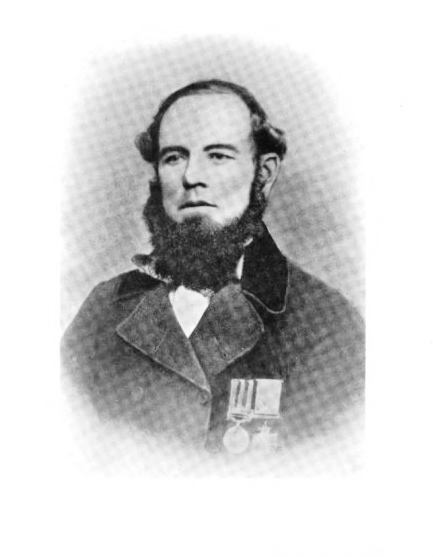
- Born: c. 1822; Newtown, County Wicklow
- Died: 6 December 1872 (aged 49–50); Dublin, Ireland
- Burial place: Glasnevin Cemetery, Dublin
- Spouse: Elizabeth Doran
- Military career
- Allegiance: United Kingdom
- Branch: British Army
- Rank: Sergeant
- Units: 86th Regiment of Foot
- Conflicts: Indian Mutiny
- Awards: Victoria Cross

James Byrne VC (Irish: Séamus Ó Broin; c. 1822 – 6 December 1872) was an Irish recipient of the Victoria Cross, the highest and most prestigious award for gallantry in the face of the enemy that can be awarded to British and Commonwealth forces.

== Details ==
Byrne was about 36 years old, and a private in the 86th Regiment of Foot (later the Royal Irish Rifles), British Army during the Indian Mutiny when the following deed took place on 3 April 1858 at Jhansi, India for which he and Captain Henry Edward Jerome were awarded the VC.

For gallant conduct on the 3 April 1858, at the attack of the Fort of Jhansi, in carrying Lieutenant Sewell, who was lying badly wounded, to a place of safety, under a very heavy fire, assisted by Captain Jerome, in the performance of which act he was wounded by a sword cut.

== Further information ==
He later achieved the rank of sergeant. He died in north Dublin.

== The medal ==
His Victoria Cross is displayed at The Royal Ulster Rifles Museum in Belfast, Northern Ireland.
