= Battle of the Pine =

- Part of Cyprus Emergency
Date	23 November 1955
Location	Cyprus
Result	EOKA victory

Belligerents
EOKA	British Empire

Commanders and leaders
George Grivas	Unknown

Strength
Unknown	1 vehicle

Casualties and losses
Possible 1 insurgent	2 dead 2 wounded

The Battle of the Pine is the name given in Greek Cypriot sources to an attack on a British army vehicle by the EOKA on 24 November 1955. A team of EOKA guerrillas ambushed the vehicles on the road from Kyperounda to Chandria killing one soldier, Sapper Robert Melson.

The next day British troops shot dead a Cypriot who approached the vehicle in which Downing died and failed to answer challenges from British soldiers.

This was one of several comparable incidents at the times which resulted in the deaths of several British servicemen and contributed to the declaration of a State of Emergency on the island.
