= 1994–95 Cypriot Second Division =

Cypriot Second Division
- Season: 1994–95
- Champions: Evagoras (6th title)
- Promoted: Evagoras; Alki
- Matches played: 115
- Goals scored: 481 (4.18 per match)

The 1994–95 Cypriot Second Division was the 40th season of the Cypriot second-level football league. Evagoras won their 6th title.

== Format ==
Eleven teams participated in the 1994–95 Cypriot Second Division. The league consisted of three rounds with ten match weeks in each round. In the first two rounds all teams played against each other twice, once at their home and once away.

The home teams for the third round matches were determined based on their league table position after the end of the second round.

The team with the most points at the end of the season crowned champions. The first two teams were promoted to 1995–96 Cypriot First Division. No team was relegated to the 1995–96 Cypriot Third Division.

== Changes from previous season ==
Teams promoted to 1994–95 Cypriot First Division

- Aris Limassol

Teams relegated from 1993–94 Cypriot First Division

- Evagoras Paphos
- APEP

Note: EPA Larnaca was also relegated from the 1993–94 Cypriot First Division. However, before the start of the season, Pezoporikos Larnaca and EPA Larnaca were merged forming AEK Larnaca, which took the place of Pezoporikos Larnaca in the Cypriot First Division.

Teams promoted from 1993–94 Cypriot Third Division

- Othellos Athienou

Teams relegated to 1994–95 Cypriot Third Division

- Orfeas Nicosia
- Ermis Aradippou
- APEP Pelendriou
- Chalkanoras Idaliou
- Ethnikos Assia

== League standings ==
Pos	Team	Pld	W	D	L	GF	GA	GD	Pts	Promotion
1	Evagoras Paphos (C, P)	30	25	3	2	81	25	+56	78	Promoted to Cypriot First Division
2	Alki Larnaca (P)	30	22	4	4	67	28	+39	70	Promoted to Cypriot First Division
3	Anagennisi Deryneia	30	16	3	11	52	47	+5	51	
4	PAEEK FC	30	13	5	12	46	46	0	44	
5	APOP Paphos	30	10	5	15	41	43	−2	35	
6	Onisilos Sotira	30	10	5	15	48	57	−9	35	
7	Othellos Athienou	30	8	10	12	35	49	−14	34	
8	Doxa Katokopias	30	8	10	12	34	50	−16	34	
9	AEZ Zakakiou	30	8	8	14	29	37	−8	32	
10	APEP	30	8	5	17	25	51	−26	29	
11	Akritas Chlorakas	30	5	6	19	23	48	−25	21	

Source: rsssf.com
Rules for classification: 1) Points, 2) Goal differences, 3) Goal for.
(C) Champions; (P) Promoted

== See also ==
- Cypriot Second Division
- 1994–95 Cypriot First Division
- 1994–95 Cypriot Cup

== Sources ==
- "1994/95 Cypriot Second Division". Rec.Sport.Soccer Statistics Foundation. 2016-01-14.
