= 1993–94 Cypriot First Division =

Cypriot First Division
- Season: 1993–94
- Champions: Apollon (2nd title)
- Relegated: EPA; Evagoras; APEP
- UEFA Cup: Apollon (preliminary round); Anorthosis (preliminary round)
- Cup Winners' Cup: Omonia (qualifying round; via Cypriot Cup)
- Matches played: 182
- Goals scored: 592 (3.25 per match)
- Top goalscorer: Siniša Gogić (26 goals)

The 1993–94 Cypriot First Division was the 55th season of the Cypriot top-level football league. Apollon Limassol won their 2nd title.

== Format ==
Fourteen teams participated in the 1993–94 Cypriot First Division. All teams played against each other twice, once at their home and once away. The team with the most points at the end of the season crowned champions. The last three teams were relegated to the 1994–95 Cypriot Second Division. The 11th-placed team faced the 2nd-placed team of the 1993–94 Cypriot Second Division, in a two-legged relegation play-off for one spot in the 1994–95 Cypriot First Division.

Apollon Limassol did not have a good enough average (Points per matches) in European Competitions over the previous five seasons (1989-90 until 1993-94) and therefore they were not allowed to enter the 1994–95 UEFA Champions League. As a result of this they had to enter the 1994–95 UEFA Cup alongside the second placed team of the league, Anorthosis Famagusta.

=== Point system ===
Teams received three points for a win, one point for a draw and zero points for a loss.

== Changes from previous season ==
Aris Limassol and APOP were relegated from previous season and played in the 1993–94 Cypriot Second Division. They were replaced by the first two teams of the 1992–93 Cypriot Second Division, Omonia Aradippou and APEP.

== Stadia and locations ==
1993–94 Cypriot First Division

Club	Venue
AEL	Tsirion Stadium
Anorthosis	Antonis Papadopoulos Stadium
APEP	Kyperounda Municipal Stadium
APOEL	Makario Stadium
Apollon	Tsirion Stadium
Ethnikos	Dasaki Stadium
Enosis	Paralimni Municipal Stadium
EPA	GSZ Stadium
Evagoras	Pafiako Stadium
Nea Salamina	Ammochostos Stadium
Olympiakos	GSP Stadium
Omonia Ar.	Aradippou Municipal Stadium
Omonia	Makario Stadium
Pezoporikos	GSZ Stadium

== League standings ==
Pos	Team	Pld	W	D	L	GF	GA	GD	Pts	Qualification or relegation
1	Apollon (C)	26	20	3	3	66	23	+43	63	Qualification for UEFA Cup preliminary round
2	Anorthosis	26	18	7	1	67	16	+51	61	Qualification for UEFA Cup preliminary round
3	APOEL	26	17	5	4	64	25	+39	56	
4	Omonia	26	16	4	6	77	33	+44	52	Qualification for Cup Winners' Cup qualifying round
5	Ethnikos Achna	26	15	2	9	45	40	+5	47	
6	AEL	26	12	4	10	43	47	−4	40	
7	Enosis Neon Paralimni	26	9	7	10	34	34	0	34	
8	Pezoporikos	26	10	4	12	34	36	−2	34	
9	Nea Salamina	26	8	8	10	32	31	+1	32	
10	Omonia Aradippou	26	8	5	13	29	49	−20	29	
11	Olympiakos (O)	26	8	3	15	36	51	−15	27	Qualification for relegation playoff
12	EPA (R)	26	7	2	17	30	53	−23	23	Relegation to Cypriot Second Division
13	Evagoras (R)	26	2	5	19	15	65	−50	11	Relegation to Cypriot Second Division
14	APEP (Note: APEP 4 points deducted) (R)	26	2	1	23	20	89	−69	3	Relegation to Cypriot Second Division

Rules for classification: 1) Points, 2) Goal differences, 3) Goals for.
(C) Champions; (O) Play-off winners; (R) Relegated

== Results ==
Home \ Away	AEL	ANR	APE	APN	APL	ETH	ENP	EPA	EVG	NSL	OLY	OMA	OMN	POL
AEL		1–4	3–1	1–3	0–2	1–0	3–6	1–0	2–1	3–2	2–3	1–1	3–2	1–0
Anorthosis	4–1		8–1	2–0	4–1	4–0	3–1	5–0	1–0	3–0	1–0	2–0	1–1	1–1
APEP	1–6	2–5		0–7	2–4	1–3	1–1	0–1	0–1	1–2	2–1	0–1	0–7	1–0
APOEL	3–1	1–1	3–1		1–1	4–0	2–1	2–0	2–0	1–0	4–1	3–0	3–2	2–3
Apollon	3–1	2–0	7–1	2–0		6–1	4–0	2–0	6–1	1–1	0–1	1–0	2–1	1–0
Ethnikos	0–0	0–1	3–1	1–1	1–2		3–0	3–1	1–0	2–1	2–1	3–0	4–3	1–2
Enosis	1–1	0–0	2–1	0–0	3–0	3–0		0–1	2–1	0–1	2–0	0–3	3–1	1–1
EPA	0–1	1–3	4–1	2–5	0–4	0–1	2–1		6–2	1–2	0–1	3–1	2–6	2–0
Evagoras	0–2	1–5	1–0	0–5	0–2	0–3	0–3	1–1		1–1	1–5	1–3	0–1	1–1
Nea Salamina	1–1	0–0	3–0	1–2	0–2	2–0	1–1	0–0	4–0		1–1	3–0	0–3	1–3
Olympiakos	1–3	0–2	6–0	1–4	0–2	2–4	2–0	3–2	1–1	1–3		1–1	1–3	1–0
Omonia Ar.	1–4	0–5	3–1	1–1	2–5	2–5	1–1	1–0	0–0	1–0	1–0		1–3	3–0
Omonia	3–0	1–1	5–0	3–1	1–1	1–2	2–1	5–0	6–0	2–2	7–2	3–1		4–2
Pezoporikos	4–0	1–1	2–1	0–4	2–3	1–2	0–1	2–1	2–1	1–0	3–0	3–1	0–1	

Legend: Blue = home team win; Yellow = draw; Red = away team win.

== Relegation play-off ==
The 11th-placed team Olympiakos Nicosia faced the 2nd-placed team of the 1993–94 Cypriot Second Division APOP Paphos, in a two-legged play-off for one spot in the 1994–95 Cypriot First Division. Olympiakos won both matches and secured their place in the 1994–95 Cypriot First Division.

- APOP 2–3 Olympiakos
- Olympiakos 2–0 APOP

== See also ==
- Cypriot First Division
- 1993–94 Cypriot Cup
- List of top goalscorers in Cypriot First Division by season
- Cypriot football clubs in European competitions

== Sources ==
- "1993/94 Cypriot First Division". Rec.Sport.Soccer Statistics Foundation. 2016-01-14.
