= James Pearson (VC) =

Recipient of the Victoria Cross (1822–1900)

- Born: 2 October 1822; Rathdowney, Queens County
- Died: 23 January 1900 (aged 77); Madras area, British India
- Military career
- Allegiance: United Kingdom
- Branch: British Army
- Rank: Sergeant
- Units: 86th Regiment of Foot; 56th Regiment of Foot
- Conflicts: Indian Mutiny
- Awards: Victoria Cross
- Other work: Prison Governor

James Pearson VC (2 October 1822 – 23 January 1900) was an Irish recipient of the Victoria Cross, the highest and most prestigious award for gallantry in the face of the enemy that can be awarded to British and Commonwealth forces.

He was 35 years old, and a private in the 86th Regiment of Foot (later The Royal Irish Rifles), British Army during the Indian Mutiny when the following deed took place on 3 April 1858 at Jhansi for which he was awarded the VC:

86th Regiment (now of the 56th Regiment), No. 1882, Private James Pearson For having gallantly attacked a number of armed rebels, on the occasion of the storming of Jhansi, on the 3rd April, 1858, one of whom he killed, and bayonetted two others. He was himself wounded in the attack. Also, for having brought in, at Calpee, under a heavy fire, Private Michael Burns, who afterwards died of his wounds.

Pearson went on to achieve the rank of Sergeant.
