= Henry Edward Jerome =

Major-General Henry Edward Jerome VC
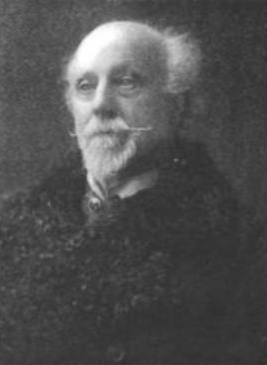
- Born: 28 February 1830; Antigua, British West Indies
- Died: 25 February 1901 (aged 70); Bath, Somerset, England
- Burial place: Lansdown Cemetery, Bath
- Military career
- Allegiance: United Kingdom
- Branch: British Army
- Rank: Major-General
- Units: 86th Regiment of Foot; 19th Regiment of Foot
- Conflicts: Indian Mutiny
- Awards: Victoria Cross

Major-General Henry Edward Jerome VC (28 February 1830 – 25 February 1901) was a British Army officer and a recipient of the Victoria Cross, the highest and most prestigious award for gallantry in the face of the enemy that can be awarded to British and Commonwealth forces.

== Career ==
Jerome was 28 years old, and a captain in the 86th Regiment of Foot (later The Royal Irish Rifles), British Army during the Indian Mutiny when the following deeds took place at Jhansi, Chandairee and Jumna for which he (and Private James Byrne) were awarded the VC:

86th Regiment (now of the 19th Regiment)

Captain (now Brevet-Major) Henry Edward Jerome Date of Acts of Bravery, 3rd April, and 28th May, 1858

For conspicuous gallantry at Jhansi, on the 3rd of April, 1858, in having, with the assistance of Private Byrne, removed, under a very heavy fire, Lieutenant Sewell, of the 86th Regiment, who was severely wounded, at a very exposed point of the attack upon the Fort; also, for gallant conduct at the capture of the Fort of Chandairee, the storming of Jhansi, and in action with a superior Rebel Force on the Jumna, on the 28th of May, 1858 when he was severely wounded.

Jerome later transferred to the 19th Regiment of Foot and achieved the rank of major general.
