= 1994–95 Cypriot Fourth Division =

Cypriot Fourth Division
- Season: 1994–95
- Champions: AEK Kakopetrias (2nd title)
- Promoted: AEK Kakopetrias; Anagennisi Germasogeias; Rotsidis Mammari; Digenis Oroklinis; ENTHOI Lakatamia FC

The 1994–95 Cypriot Fourth Division was the tenth season of the Cypriot fourth-level football league. AEK Kakopetrias won their 2nd title. The first 5 teams were promoted to the 1995–96 Cypriot Third Division.

== See also ==
- Cypriot Fourth Division
- 1994–95 Cypriot First Division
- 1994–95 Cypriot Cup
