= Hugh Cochrane =

Recipient of the Victoria Cross (1829–1884)

Hugh Stewart Cochrane
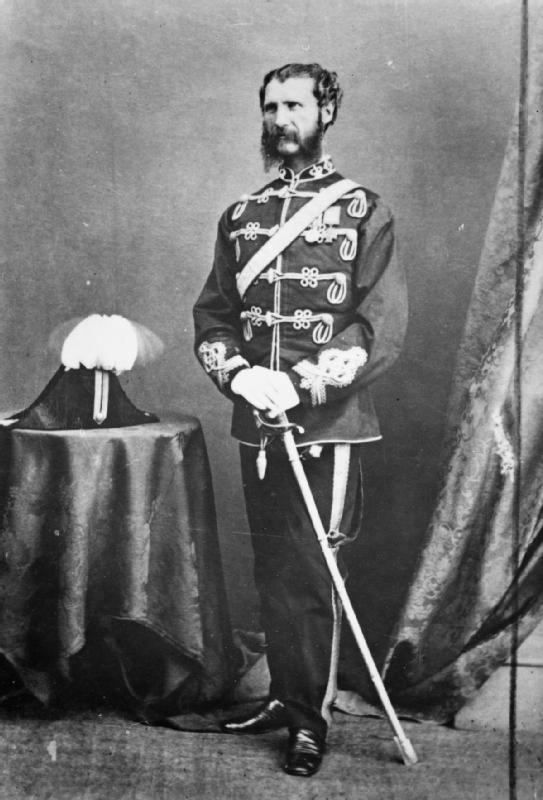
- Born: 4 August 1829; Fort William, Scotland
- Died: 23 April 1884 (aged 54); Southsea, Hampshire
- Burial place: Highland Road Cemetery, Portsmouth
- Military career
- Allegiance: United Kingdom
- Branch: British Army
- Service years: 1849–1882
- Rank: Colonel
- Units: 86th Regiment of Foot; 16th Regiment of Foot; 7th Regiment of Foot; 43rd Regiment of Foot
- Conflicts: Indian Mutiny
- Awards: Victoria Cross

Colonel Hugh Stewart Cochrane VC (4 August 1829 – 23 April 1884) was a recipient of the Victoria Cross for his actions, as a 28-year-old lieutenant, during the Indian Mutiny. He later achieved the rank of colonel and commanded the 43rd Foot and (briefly) its successor, the 1st Battalion, Oxfordshire and Buckinghamshire Light Infantry. Cochrane was born in Fort William, Scotland and died in Southsea in England.

Cochrane was a lieutenant in the 86th (Royal County Down) Regiment of Foot (later The Royal Irish Rifles), British Army stationed in India during the Indian Mutiny. For the following deed on 1 April 1858 near Jhansi, India he was awarded the Victoria Cross, the highest and most prestigious award for gallantry in the face of the enemy that can be awarded to British and Commonwealth forces:

For conspicuous gallantry near Jhansi, on the 1st of April, 1858, when No. 1 Company of the Regiment was ordered to take a gun, in dashing forward at a gallop, under a heavy musketry and artillery fire, driving the enemy from the gun, and keeping possession of it till the Company came up. Also for conspicuous gallantry in attacking the rear-guard of the enemy, when he had three horses shot under him in succession. Despatch from Major-General Sir Hugh Henry Rose, G.C.B., dated 23rd April, 1858.

Grave of Hugh Stewart Cochrane
