= Royal Ulster Rifles =

British Army infantry regiment

Royal Irish Rifles Royal Ulster Rifles
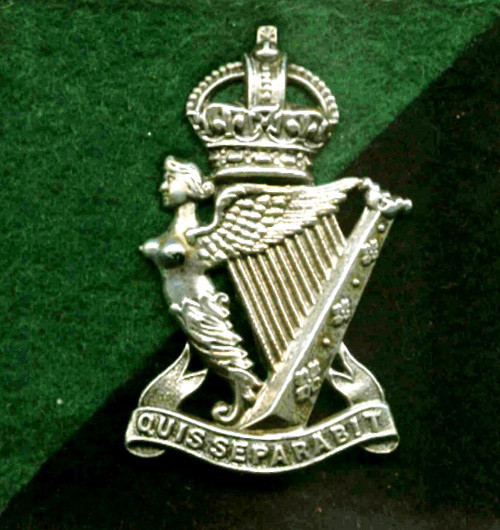
- Cap badge
- Active: 1881–1968
- Country: Kingdom of Great Britain (1793–1800); United Kingdom (1800–1968)
- Branch: British Army
- Type: Light infantry
- Size: 1-2 Regular battalions 3 Militia and Special Reserve battalions Up to 16 Hostilities-only battalions
- Garrison/HQ: RHQ – Victoria Barracks, Belfast (1881-1937); St Patrick's Barracks, Ballymena (1937-1968)
- Nicknames: The Stickies, The Rifles
- Motto: Quis Separabit (Who shall separate us [from the love of Christ]) (Latin)
- Colours: None as a rifle regiment
- March: Quick: "The Ulster Rifles march 'Off, Off, Said the Stranger'"; Pipes and Drums: "South Down Militia"
- Anniversaries: Somme Day, 1 July
- Engagements: Badajoz, Jhansi, Somme, Normandy Landings, Rhine Crossing, Korea

Insignia
- Abbreviation: RUR (RIR)

The Royal Irish Rifles (became the Royal Ulster Rifles from 1 January 1921) was a light infantry rifle regiment of the British Army, first created in 1881 by the amalgamation of the 83rd (County of Dublin) Regiment of Foot and the 86th (Royal County Down) Regiment of Foot. The regiment saw service in the Second Boer War, the First World War, the Second World War, the Korean War and the Cyprus Emergency.

In 1968 the Royal Ulster Rifles was amalgamated with the other regiments of the North Irish Brigade, the Royal Irish Fusiliers (Princess Victoria's), and the Royal Inniskilling Fusiliers to create the Royal Irish Rangers.

== History ==
=== Early years ===
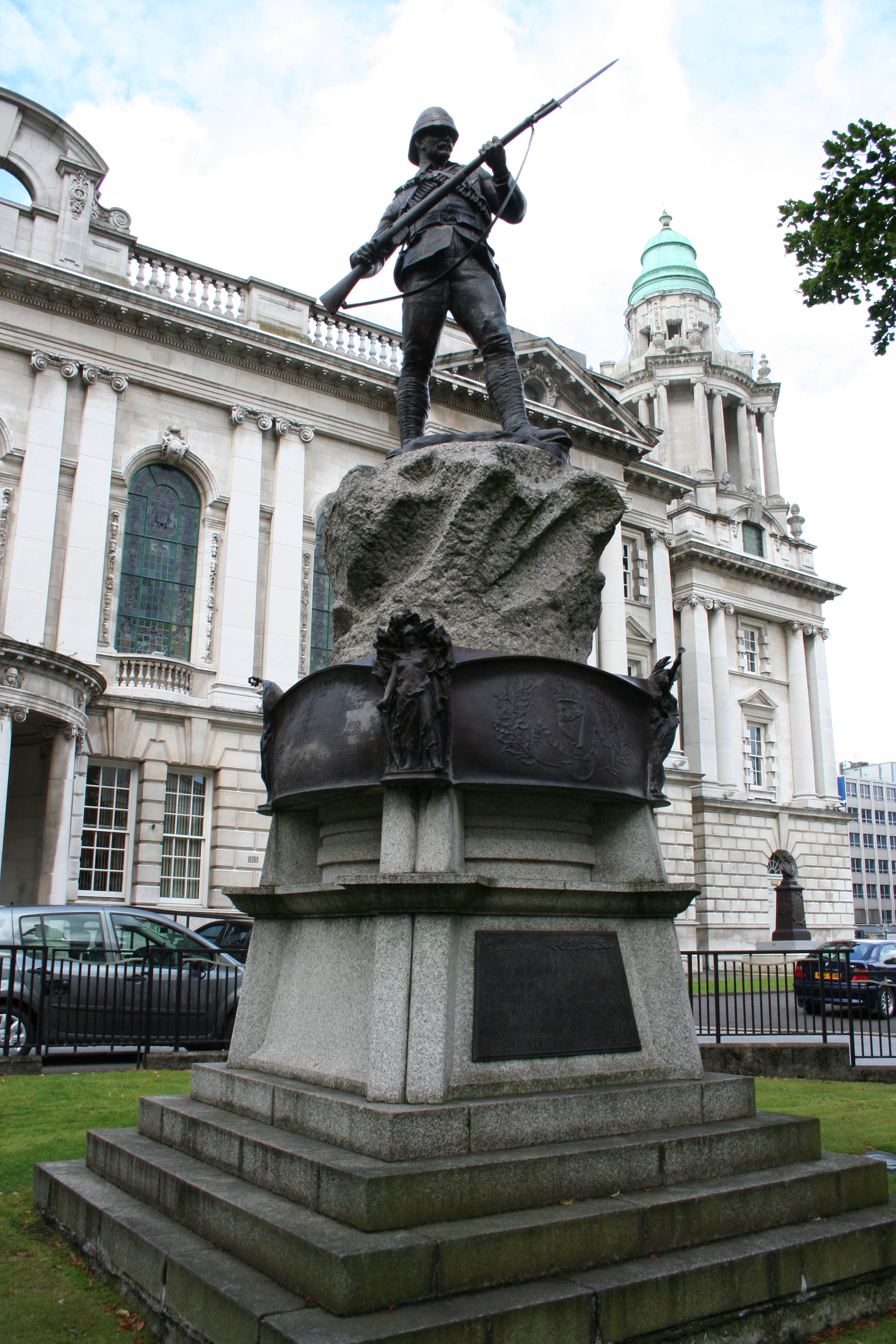
Monument to the men of the Royal Irish Rifles who died in the Second Boer War in the grounds of Belfast City Hall

The regiment's history dates backs to the reign of King George III. In 1793 the British Army expanded to meet the commitments of the war with the French First Republic. As part of that expansion it raised two new regiments of foot, the 83rd and the 86th. In 1881, under the Childers Reforms, the 83rd and 86th were amalgamated into a single regiment, named the Royal Irish Rifles, one of eight infantry regiments raised and garrisoned in Ireland. It was the county regiment of Antrim, Down, Belfast and Louth, with its depot located at Victoria Barracks, Belfast. Militarily, the whole of Ireland was administered as a single command within the United Kingdom with Command Headquarters at Parkgate (Phoenix Park) Dublin, directly under the War Office in London.

=== Second Boer War ===
The 2nd battalion of the regiment took part in the Second Boer War in South Africa, with more than 1,000 men leaving Belfast in October 1899. They suffered serious losses at the Battle of Stormberg in December 1899, and continued fighting throughout the war, which ended in May 1902. A large contingent of officers and men returned to Ireland in February 1903, and took part in a special parade before they all received medals. In October 1905, a memorial was erected in the grounds of Belfast City Hall in memory of the 132 who did not return. Field Marshal Lord Grenfell unveiled the memorial while the Times reported the event.

In 1908, the Volunteers and Militia were reorganised nationally, with the former becoming the Territorial Force and the latter the Special Reserve; the regiment now had three Reserve but no Territorial battalions.

=== First World War ===
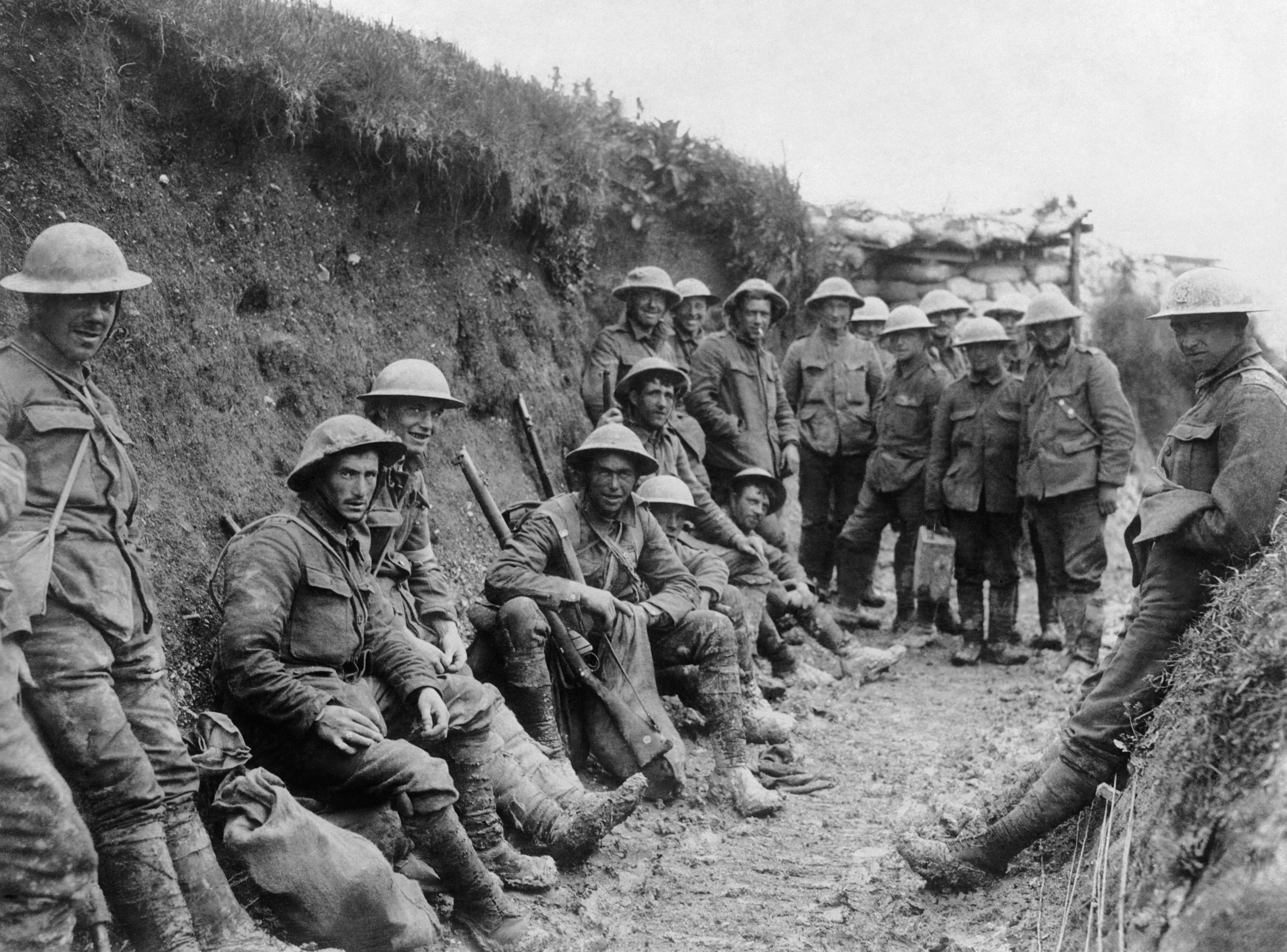
Infantry of the Royal Irish Rifles during the Battle of the Somme in the First World War

==== Regular Army ====
The 1st Battalion landed at Le Havre as part of the 25th Brigade in the 8th Division in November 1914 for service on the Western Front. It saw action at the Battle of Neuve Chapelle in March 1915, the Battle of Fromelles in July 1915 and the Battle of Loos in September 1915 before taking part in the Battle of the Somme in September 1916.

The 2nd Battalion landed at Rouen as part of the 7th Brigade in the 3rd Division in August 1914 and in the remainder of that year saw action at the Battle of Mons, Battle of Le Cateau, First Battle of the Marne, First Battle of the Aisne, Battle of La Bassée and the Battle of Messines. By September 1914, only 6 officers and 200 men of the Battalion's original 1,100 men were still in active service. By October the battalion had been further reduced to two officers and 46 men and by the end of 1914, 97 per cent of the original battalion had been killed, injured or taken prisoner.

==== New Armies ====
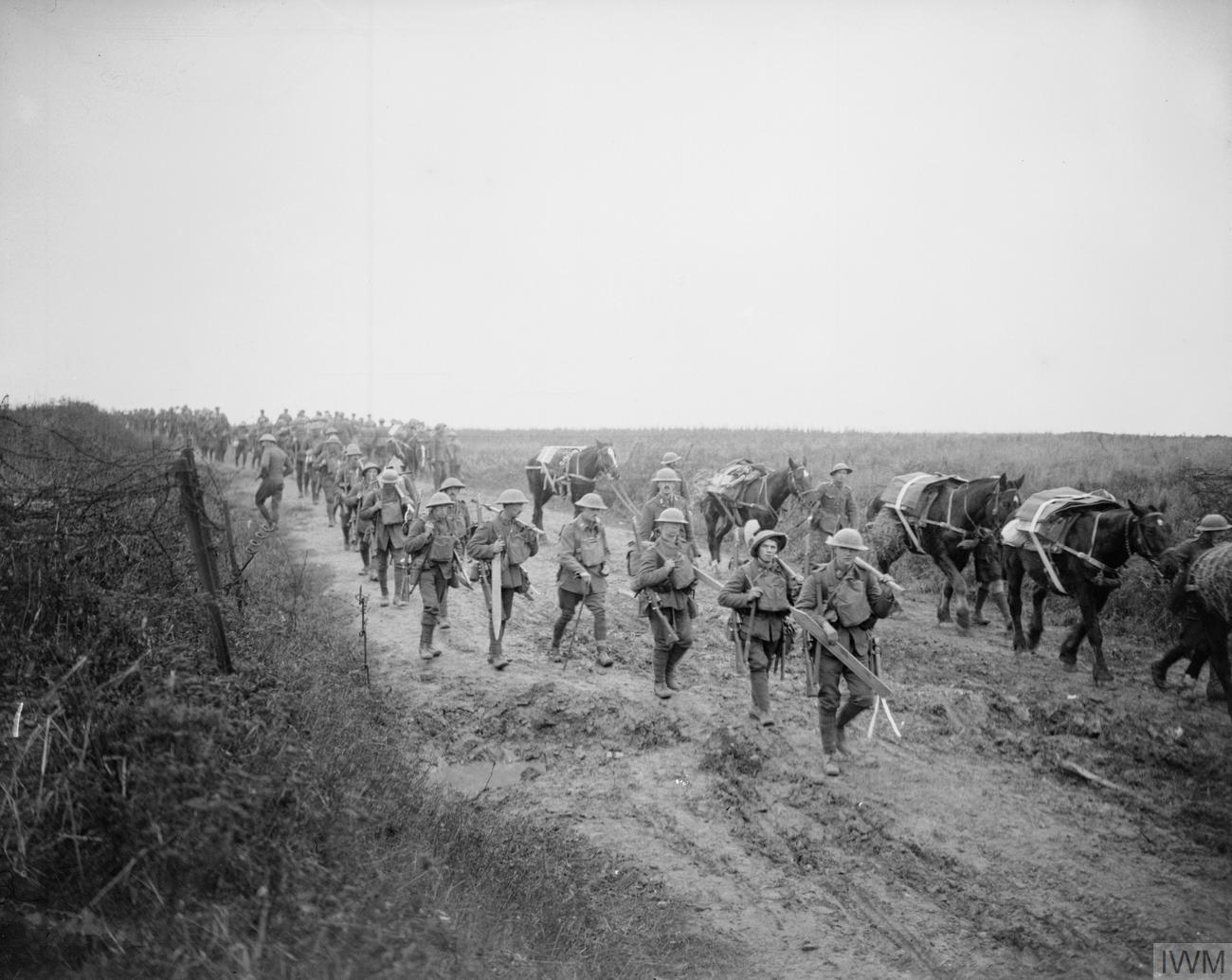
Men of the 16th (Service) Battalion, Royal Irish Rifles, the pioneer battalion of the 36th (Ulster) Division, moving to the frontline 20 November 1917.

The 6th (Service) Battalion fought in the Gallipoli campaign, landed at Anzac Cove as part of the 29th Brigade in the 10th (Irish) Division in August 1915 but moved to Salonika in October 1915, where it served on the Macedonian front for the next two years, and to Egypt for service in Palestine in September 1917.

The 7th (Service) Battalion, which absorbed a company of the Royal Jersey Militia, landed at Le Havre as part of the 48th Brigade in the 16th (Irish) Division in December 1915 for service on the Western Front. James Steele, a future general, served with the 7th Battalion.

The 8th (Service) Battalion (East Belfast), 9th (Service) Battalion (West Belfast) and 10th (Service) Battalion (South Belfast) landed at Boulogne-sur-Mer as part of the 107th Brigade in the 36th (Ulster) Division in October 1915 for service on the Western Front.

The 11th (Service) Battalion (South Antrim), 12th (Service) Battalion (Central Antrim) and 13th (Service) Battalion (1st County Down) landed at Boulogne-sur-Mer as part of the 108th Brigade in the 36th (Ulster) Division in October 1915 for service on the Western Front.

The 14th (Service) Battalion (Young Citizens) landed at Boulogne-sur-Mer as part of the 109th Brigade in the 36th (Ulster) Division in October 1915 for service on the Western Front.

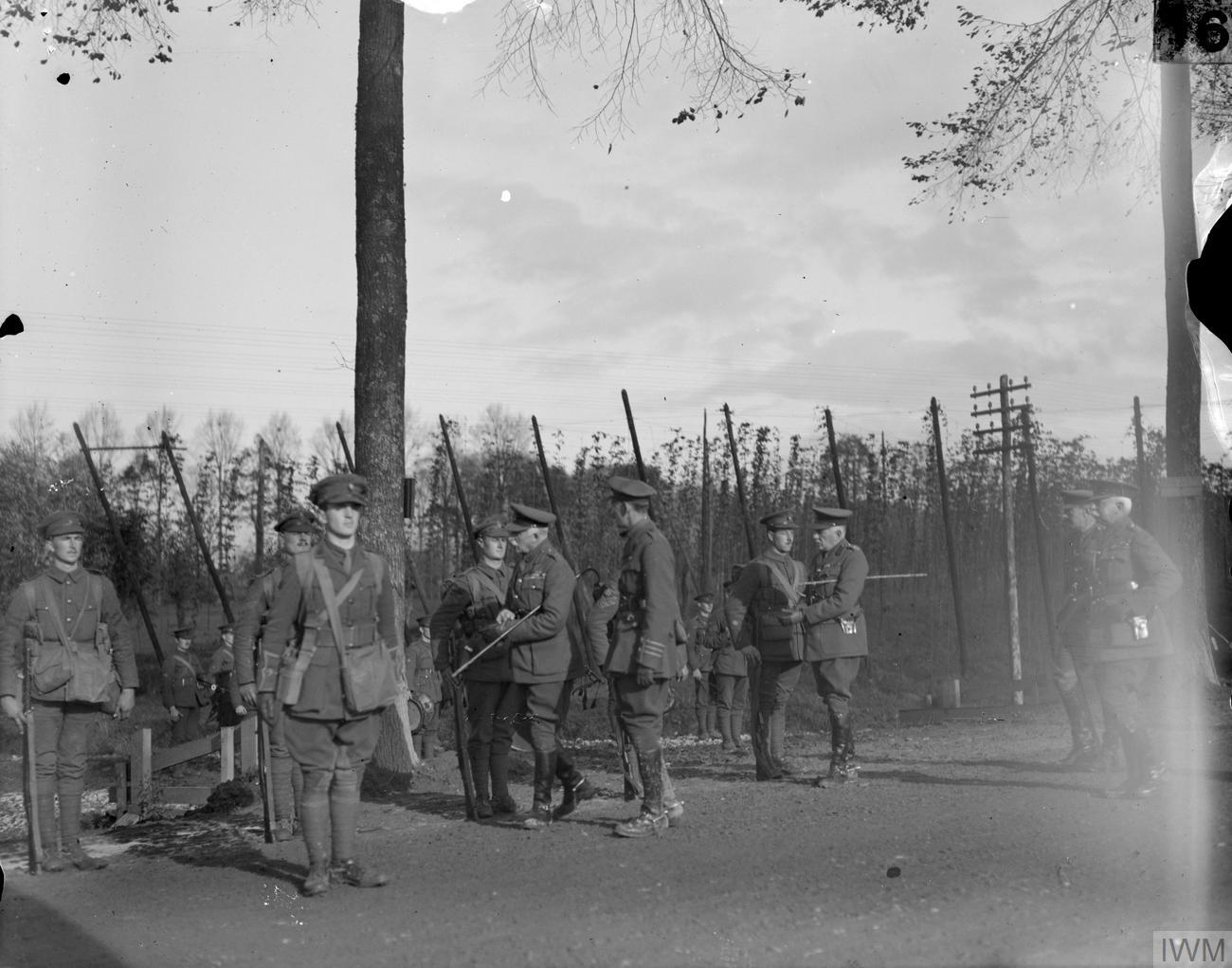
Prince Arthur, the Duke of Connaught inspecting the Royal Irish Rifles, near Vlamertinghe, September 1916.

The 15th (Service) Battalion (North Belfast) landed at Boulogne-sur-Mer as part of the 107th Brigade in the 36th (Ulster) Division in October 1915 for service on the Western Front.

The 16th (Service) Battalion (2nd County Down) (Pioneers) landed at Boulogne-sur-Mer as pioneer battalion for the 36th (Ulster) Division in October 1915 for service on the Western Front.

Some 7,010 soldiers from the Royal Irish Rifles were killed in action during the First World War.

=== Between the world wars ===
After the First World War the War Office decided that Ulster should be represented on the Army List as Connaught, Leinster and Munster already had their own regiments and so, in 1920, a new name was proposed for the Royal Irish Rifles. From 1 January 1921 the regiment became the Royal Ulster Rifles. The regiment moved to St Patrick's Barracks in 1937. In 1937 the already close relationship with the London Irish Rifles was formally recognised when they were incorporated into the Corps while still retaining their regimental identity as a territorial battalion. Two years later the London Irish formed a second battalion.

=== Second World War ===
==== Regular Army ====
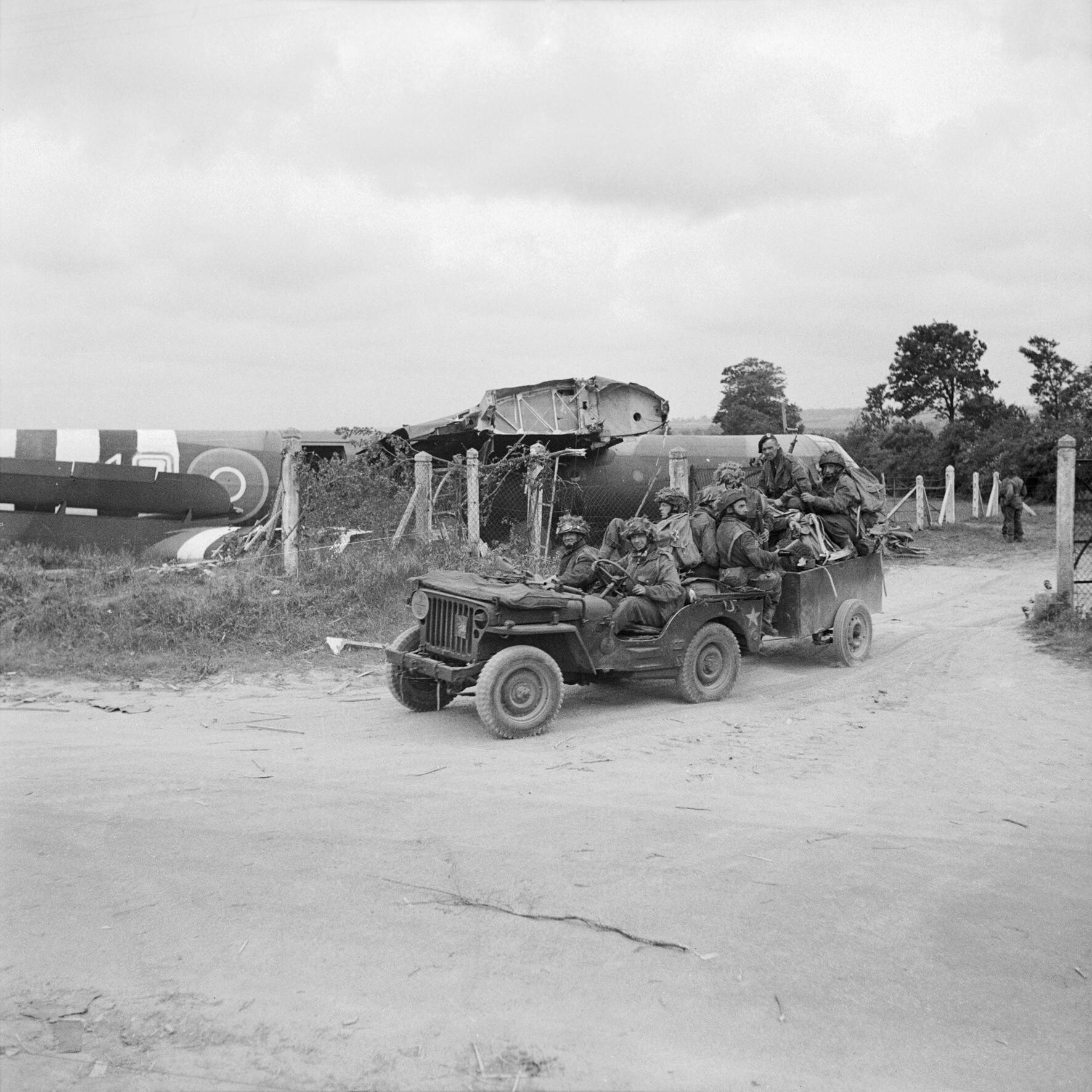
Riflemen of the Royal Ulster Rifles, 6 Airlanding Brigade, aboard a jeep and trailer, driving off Landing Zone N past a crashed Airspeed Horsa glider on the evening of 6 June 1944.

When war was declared the 1st Battalion was serving in India, with the 31st Independent Brigade Group, which was trained in mountain warfare. When the brigade returned to the United Kingdom, it was decided that, with its light scale of equipment, the brigade could be converted into a glider-borne unit. 31st Infantry Brigade, which also included the 1st Border Regiment, 2nd South Staffs and 2nd Ox and Bucks, was renamed 1st Airlanding Brigade and trained as glider infantry. They were assigned to the 1st Airborne Division, part of the British Army's airborne forces. The battalion, along with the 2nd Oxford and Bucks Light Infantry, were later transferred to join the 12th Devonshire Regiment in the 6th Airlanding Brigade as part of the newly raised 6th Airborne Division which was actually only the second of two airborne divisions created by the British Army in World War II.

Carried in Horsa gliders, the battalion took part in Operation Mallard, the British glider-borne landings in the later afternoon of 6 June 1944, otherwise known as D-Day. They served throughout the Battle of Normandy employed as normal infantry until August 1944 and the breakout from the Normandy beachhead where the entire 6th Airborne Division advanced 45 miles in 9 days. They returned to England in September 1944 for rest and retraining until December 1944 when the 6th Airborne was then recalled to Belgium after the surprise German offensive in the Ardennes which is now known as the Battle of the Bulge where the division played a comparatively small role in the mainly-American battle. They then took part in their final airborne mission of the war known as Operation Varsity, which was the airborne element of Operation Plunder, the crossing of the River Rhine by the 21st Army Group in March 1945. The 6th Airborne was joined by the U.S. 17th Airborne Division, and both divisions suffered heavy casualties.

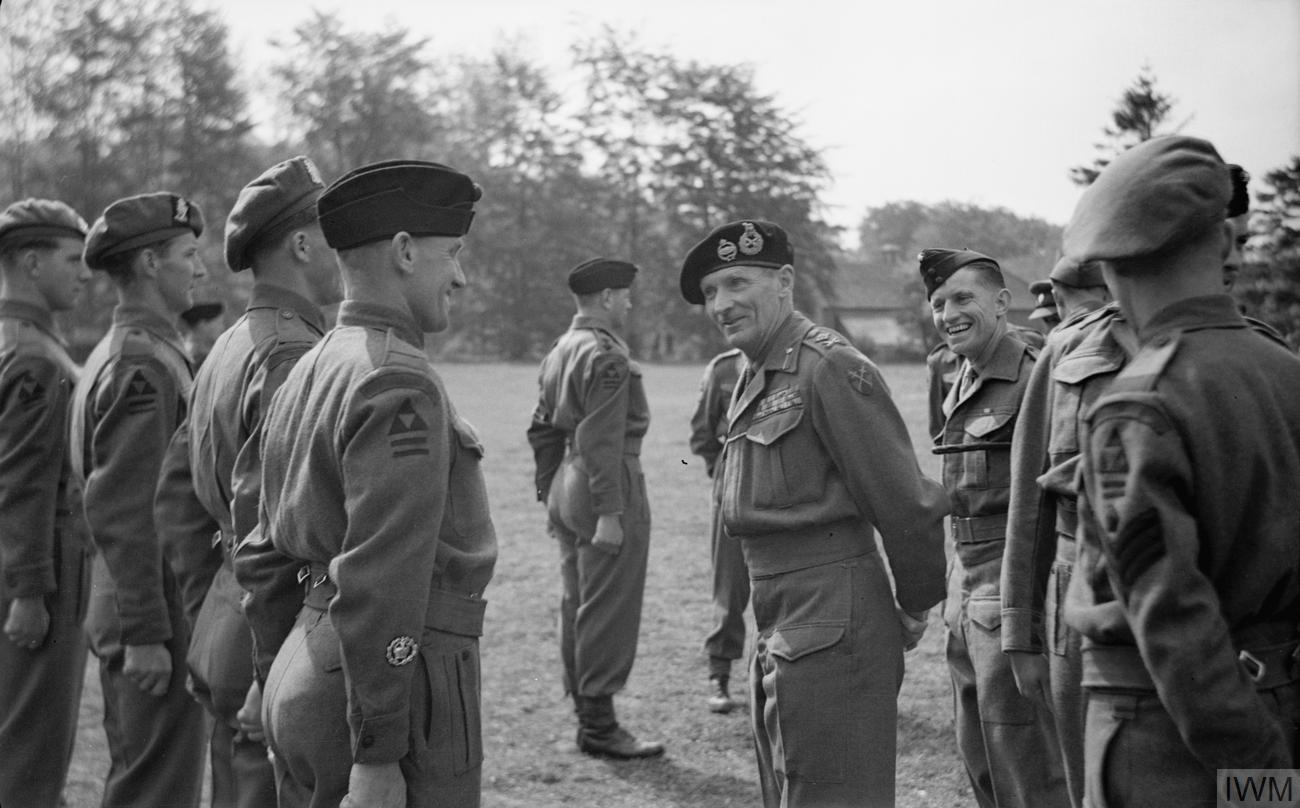
General Sir Bernard Montgomery talking to Company Sergeant Major Kelly of Aldershot during a visit to 2nd Battalion, Royal Ulster Rifles near Portsmouth in the run-up to D-Day. The battalion had previously served in his division earlier in the war.

The 2nd Battalion was part of the 9th Infantry Brigade, 3rd Infantry Division serving with the British Expeditionary Force (BEF) in France from 1939–1940. The division was commanded by the then Major General Bernard Montgomery who would eventually lead the Anglo-Canadian forces as commander of the 21st Army Group in the North West Europe Campaign. The 3rd Infantry Division took part in the Battle of Dunkirk, where it gained a decent reputation and earned the nickname of "Monty's Ironsides", and had to be evacuated from Dunkirk with the rest of the BEF. The battalion returned to Europe for the D-Day landings in June 1944 and fought in the Battle of Normandy, specifically in Operation Charnwood where they were the first British troops to enter the city of Caen, which had previously seen bitter fighting in the British attempt to capture it.

==== Hostilities-only ====
The 6th (Home Defence) Battalion was raised in 1939 from No. 200 Group National Defence Companies and consisting of older men with previous military experience who were unfit for active service. On 24 December 1940 the battalion was redesignated as the 30th Battalion, dropping the Home Defence from its title, and converted to a regular infantry battalion. It was disbanded in Northern Ireland in May 1943. The 7th (Home Defence) Battalion was raised on 29 June 1940, joining the 215th Independent Infantry Brigade (Home). The battalion served in Ulster until leaving for Great Britain in September 1942. On 24 December 1941, the battalion was redesignated the 31st Battalion and dropped the Home Defence title.

The 8th Battalion, Royal Ulster Rifles, was also raised in 1940, and joined 203rd Independent Infantry Brigade (Home). In early 1942 the battalion was transferred to the Royal Artillery and converted into the 117th Light Anti-Aircraft Regiment, Royal Artillery. The regiment served with Home Forces until November 1942 when it was sent overseas to North Africa to fight in the final stages of the North African Campaign as part of the British First Army. In September 1943 the regiment landed in Italy shortly after the initial invasion, now as part of the British Eighth Army, and served on the Italian Front until June 1944, when the regiment was broken up and the men were retrained as infantrymen, due to a severe shortage of infantrymen, particularly in Italy. Many of the men retrained were sent to the 2nd, 7th and 10th battalions of the Rifle Brigade (Prince Consort's Own), another rifle regiment, in 61st Lorried Infantry Brigade, part of 6th Armoured Division.

The 70th (Young Soldiers) Battalion was formed on 12 September 1940 at Holywood from the younger soldiers of the 6th and 7th battalions and volunteers of the ages of 18 and 19 who were too young for conscription. The battalion spent most of its time guarding airfields and aerodromes before moving to Great Britain in October 1941.

=== Post-war ===
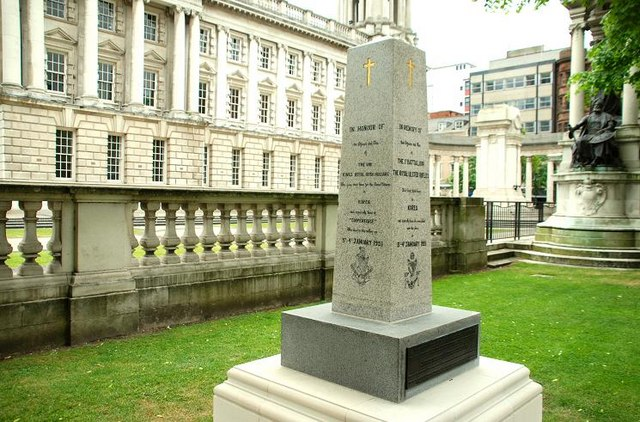
The Korean War memorial, at Belfast City Hall

In 1947 the Royal Ulster Rifles were grouped with the other two remaining Irish regiments, the Royal Inniskilling Fusiliers and the Royal Irish Fusiliers, into the North Irish Brigade. In 1948, the 2nd Battalion was amalgamated with the 1st Battalion to form the 1st Battalion, Royal Ulster Rifles (83rd and 86th), thus retaining the history of both of the previous regiments of foot.

The 1st Battalion, Royal Ulster Rifles disembarked at Pusan in early November 1950 as part of the 29th Independent Infantry Brigade Group for service in the Korean War. They were transported forward to Uijeongbu, where under the direct command of the Eighth United States Army they were directed against guerrilla forces swept past by the rapid progress of the United Nations Army. By mid December 1950 a defensive line was being prepared on the south bank of the River Han on the border with North Korea protecting the approach to Seoul, the capital of South Korea. As the New Year started, the Fiftieth Chinese Communist Army engaged the United Nations troops focusing on 29 Brigade, who were dispersed over a very wide front (12 miles). The Royal Ulster Rifles fighting with 1st Battalion, Royal Northumberland Fusiliers were able to hold their position in their first major action at the Chaegunghyon and the Communist Army's progress was halted, at least temporarily.

The Battle of the Imjin River began on 22 April 1951 with the goal of taking Seoul. By 25 April 1951, the Brigade was ordered to withdraw as the Communist forces were threatening to encircle it. With virtually no cover and seriously outnumbered, the Royal Ulster Rifles came under heavy fire as they withdrew to a blocking position. The Brigade was able to hold its position, despite fierce fighting, and neutralized the effectiveness of the Sixty-fourth Chinese Communist Army. Although the enemy's offensive had come within 5 miles of Seoul, the capital had been saved. At the time, the Times reported the Battle of Imjin River concluding with: The fighting 5th wearing St George and the Dragon and the Irish Giants with the Harp and Crown have histories that they would exchange with no one. As pride, sobered by mourning for fallen observes how well these young men have acquitted themselves in remotest Asia. The parts taken by the regiments may be seen as a whole. The motto of the Royal Ulster Rifles may have the last word Quis Separabit (who shall separate us).

As a result of this action, members of the Royal Ulster Rifles were awarded two Distinguished Service Orders, two Military Crosses, two Military Medals, and three men were Mentioned in Despatches. When the area was recaptured, a memorial was erected to the 208 men killed or missing after the battle. It stood overlooking the battlefield until 1962 when Seoul's growth threatened to consume it, and it was carried by HMS Belfast back to Ireland where it was the focus of St Patrick's Barracks in Ballymena. When the barracks closed in 2008, the Imjin River Memorial was again moved, this time to the grounds of the Belfast City Hall.

The Regiment continued to accept recruits from the rest of Ireland; for example, almost 50% of personnel in the 1st Battalion who arrived in Korea in 1950 were Irish nationals.

The regiment was deployed to Cyprus during the Cyprus Emergency. On 1 September 1958, in the village of Liopetri, the regiment were attacked by an EOKA team of four who were all subsequently killed in the ensuing fire fight.

In July 1968 the Royal Ulster Rifles amalgamated with the Royal Inniskilling Fusiliers and the Royal Irish Fusiliers to form the Royal Irish Rangers (27th (Inniskilling), 83rd and 87th).

== Regimental museum ==
The Royal Ulster Rifles Museum is located in the Cathedral Quarter, Belfast. The museum's artefacts include uniforms, badges, medals, regimental memorabilia, trophies, paintings and photographs.

== Victoria Cross ==
Recipients of the Victoria Cross:

- Lieutenant Hugh Cochrane, 86th (Royal County Down) Regiment of Foot, Betwa, India, April 1858
- Lieutenant Henry Edward Jerome, 86th (Royal County Down) Regiment of Foot, Jhansi, India, April 1858
- Private James Byrne, 86th (Royal County Down) Regiment of Foot, Jhansi, India, April 1858
- Private James Pearson, 86th (Royal County Down) Regiment of Foot, Jhansi, India, April 1858
- Rifleman William McFadzean. 14th (Service) Battalion, Royal Irish Rifles. 1916. Thiepval.
- Rifleman Robert Quigg. 12th (Service) Battalion, Royal Irish Rifles. 1916. Hamel, Somme.
- Second Lieutenant Edmund De Wind. 15th (Service) Battalion, Royal Irish Rifles. 1918. Grugies, France.

== Great War Memorials ==
- Ulster Tower Memorial Thiepval, France.
- Irish National War Memorial Gardens, Dublin.
- Island of Ireland Peace Park Messines, Belgium.
- Menin Gate Memorial Ypres, Belgium.
- War Memorial of Korea Seoul, South Korea

== Battle honours ==
The regiment's battle honours were as follows:

- Early wars: South Africa 1899-1902
- The Great War: Mons, Le Cateau, Retreat from Mons, Marne 1914, Aisne 1914, La Bassée 1914, Messines 1914 '17 '18, Armentières 1914, Ypres 1914 '15 '17 '18, Nonne Bosschen, Neuve Chapelle, Frezenberg, Aubers, Somme 1916 '18, Albert 1916, Bazentin, Pozières, Guillemont, Ginchy, Ancre Heights, Pilckem, Langemarck 1917, Cambrai 1917, St. Quentin, Rosières, Lys, Bailleul, Kemmel, Courtrai, France and Flanders 1914-18, Kosturino, Struma, Macedonia 1915-17, Suvla, Sari Bair, Gallipoli 1915, Gaza, Jerusalem, Tell 'Asur, Palestine 1917-18
- The Second World War: Dyle, Dunkirk 1940, Normandy Landing, Cambes, Caen, Troarn, Venlo Pocket, Rhine, Bremen, North-West Europe 1940 '44-45
- Later wars: Seoul, Imjin, Korea 1950-51

== Regimental Colonels ==
Colonels of the Regiment were:

The Royal Irish Rifles

- 1881–1883:(1st Battalion) Gen. William Gustavus Brown (ex 83rd Foot)
- 1881–1886:(2nd Battalion only to 1883) F.M. Sir John Michel, GCB (ex 86th Foot)
- 1886–1914: Gen. Wilmot Henry Bradford
- 1914–1915: Gen. Sir Charles John Burnett, KCB, KCVO
- 1915–1922: F.M. Sir Henry Hughes Wilson, Bt, GCB, DSO

The Royal Ulster Rifles (1921)

- 1922–1937: Gen. Sir Alexander John Godley, GCB, GCMG
- 1937–1947: Lt-Gen. Sir Denis John Charles Kirwan Bernard, KCB, CMG, DSO
- 1947–1957: Gen. Sir James Stuart Steele, GCB, KBE, DSO, MC
- 1957–1962: Brig. Ian Henry Good, DSO
- 1962–1968: Maj-Gen. Ian Cecil Harris, CB, CBE, DSO (to Royal Irish Rangers)
- 1968 Regiment merged with The Royal Inniskilling Fusiliers and The Royal Irish Fusiliers (Princess Victoria's) to form the Royal Irish Rangers

== Alliances ==
- Singapore – 2nd Battalion, Singapore Infantry Regiment

== See also ==
- List of British Army regiments (1881)
- Young Citizen Volunteers

== Sources ==
- Chant, Christopher (1988). The handbook of British regiments. Routledge. ISBN 978-0-415-00241-7.
- Ferguson, Gregory (1984). The Paras 1940–84. Volume 1 of Elite series. Oxford, United Kingdom: Osprey Publishing. ISBN 0-85045-573-1.
- Harris, Major Henry E. D. (1968). The Irish Regiments in the First World War. Mercer Press Cork. ISBN 978-0853420729.
- Joslen, H. F. (2003) [1960]. Orders of Battle: Second World War, 1939–1945. Uckfield, East Sussex: Naval and Military Press. ISBN 978-1-84342-474-1.
- Roe, Lt. F.P. (1923). A Short History of the Royal Ulster Rifles. Aldershot: Gale & Polden. OCLC 771232739.
- Williams, Jeffery (1988). The Long Left Flank: The Hard Fought Way to the Reich, 1944–1945. Toronto: Stoddart. ISBN 0-7737-2194-0.
- Lowry, Gerald (1933). From Mons to 1933. Marshall Simpkin Ltd. ISBN 978-1-334-97215-7.
