= Battle of Liopetri =

Liopetri Incident
- Part of Cyprus Emergency
Date	1–2 September 1958
Location	Liopetri, Cyprus
Result	British victory

Belligerents
British Empire: Royal Ulster Rifles	EOKA

Commanders and leaders
Harold Macmillan; Hugh Foot	Georgios Grivas; Andreas Karyos †; Fotis Pittas †; Ilias Papakyriakou †; Christos Samaras †

Strength
Approximately 24	4

Casualties and losses
1 killed, several injured	4 killed

The Battle of Liopetri was a minor engagement that took place on 1–2 September 1958 as part of the Cyprus Emergency. British soldiers in the village of Liopetri were attacked by an EOKA team of four who were subsequently killed in the ensuing fire fight.

The gunmen opened fire on elements of the 1st Battalion the Royal Ulster Rifles. The British then sealed off the village, imposed a curfew and began looking for the men. They were eventually located in a barn and a gun battle ensued in which all four EOKA gunmen were killed.

Corporal Patrick Shaughnessey was awarded a Military Medal for his actions in subduing an EOKA gunman whilst unarmed and then dragging two wounded men to safety.

The barn at Liopetri is now a national monument, the Akhyronas Barn Museum, and includes a bronze statue of the four EOKA men who died.

The battle resulted in Colonel Georgios Grivas calling an end to a truce that had been in effect since August.
