= Liopetri =

Liopetri: Λιοπέτρι (Greek); Liopetri (Turkish)
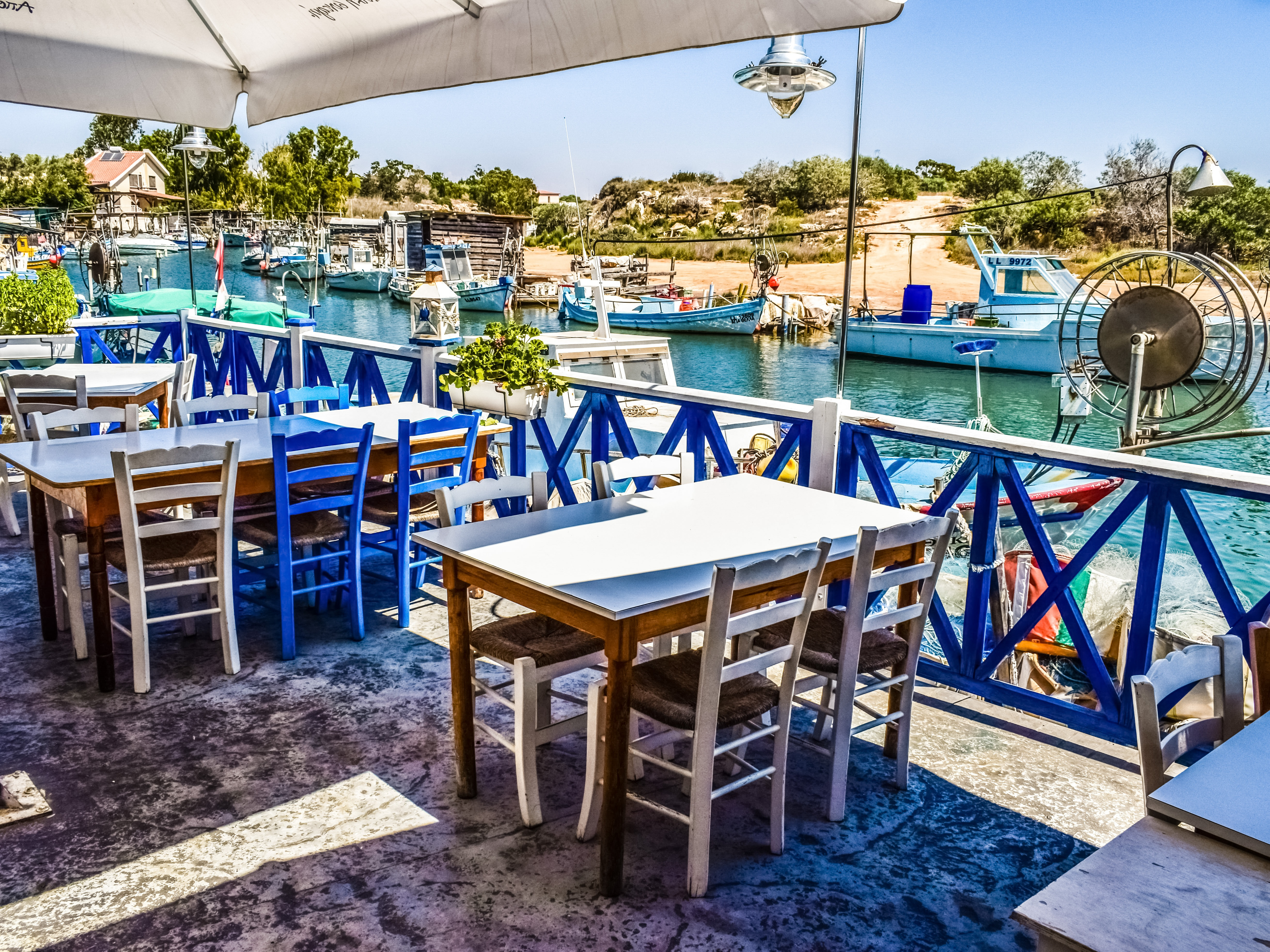

- Location within Cyprus
- Coordinates: 35°00′34″N 33°53′34″E
- Country: Cyprus
- District: Famagusta District

Population (2011)
  - Total: 4,591

Liopetri (Greek: Λιοπέτρι, Greek pronunciation: [ʎoˈpetri]; Turkish: Liopetri) is a village in southern Famagusta District, in Cyprus. It is close to the communities of Frenaros, Sotira, Avgorou and Xylofagou (Larnaca District). In 2011, Liopetri had a population of 4,591.

On 2 September 1958 a battle was fought here between British armed forces and four EOKA fighters, Fotis Pittas, Andreas Karios, Elias Papakyriakou and Christos Samaras, who were from Liopetri. The barn where this took place is now a National Memorial.
