= Georgios Grivas =

Cypriot army officer and resistance fighter (1897-1974)

- Γεώργιος Γρίβας
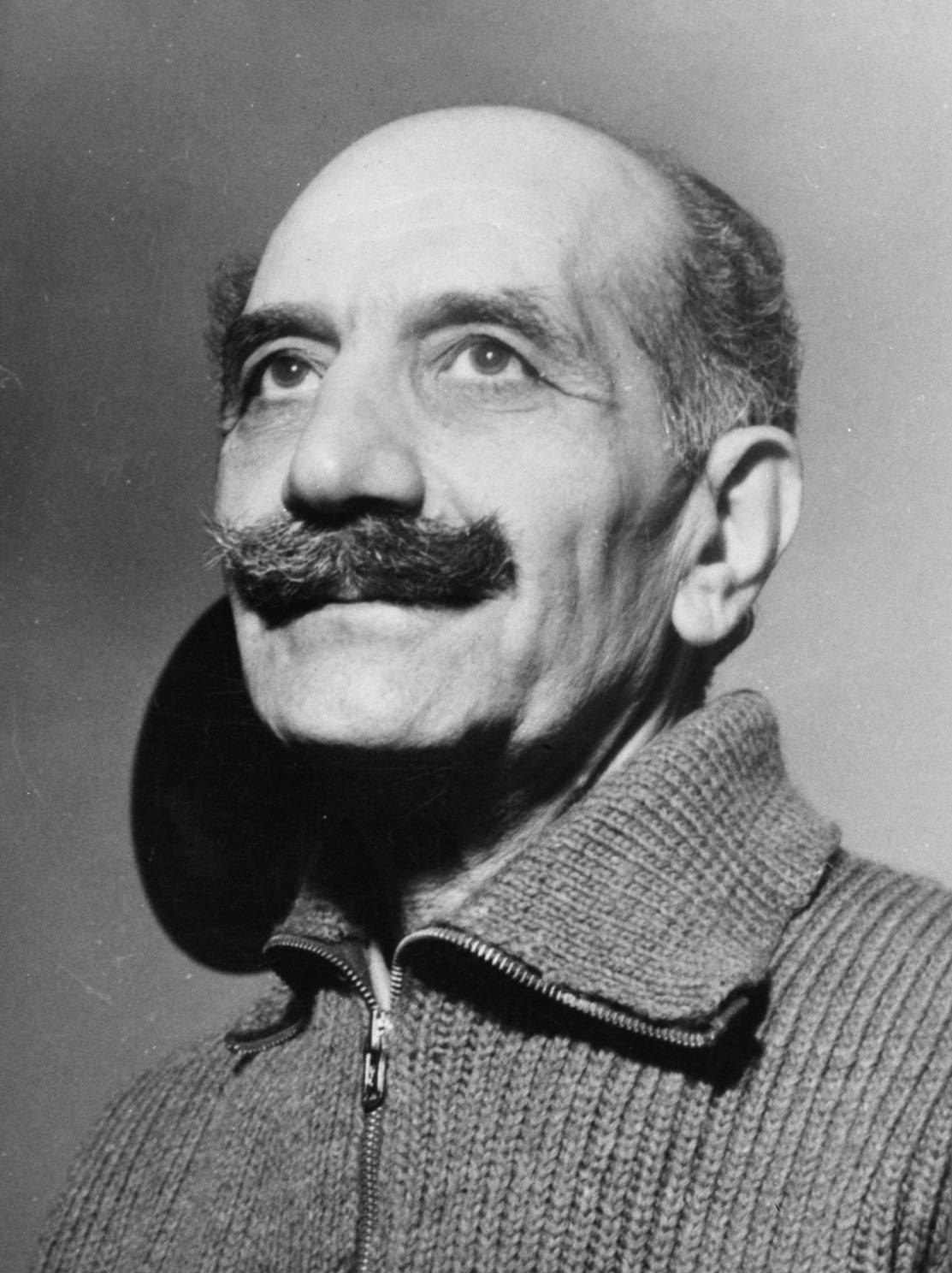
- Grivas c. 1967
- Born: 6 June 1897; Trikomo, British Cyprus (now Republic of Cyprus)
- Died: 27 January 1974 (aged 76); Limassol, Republic of Cyprus
- Burial place: Limassol, Republic of Cyprus
- Education: Hellenic Military Academy; École Militaire
- Military career
- Allegiance: Kingdom of Greece; Second Hellenic Republic; Republic of Cyprus
- Branch: Hellenic Army; Cypriot National Guard
- Service years: 1916-1974
- Rank: Lieutenant general
- Nicknames: Digenis; Διγενής
- Unit: 10th Infantry Division
- Conflicts: Greco-Turkish War (1919–1922); Battle of the Sakarya; World War II; Greco-Italian War; Battle of Greece; Greek resistance; Greek Civil War; Dekemvriana; Cyprus Emergency; 1 April Attacks; Battle of the Pine; Battle of Spilia; Battle at Nicosia Hospital; Battle of Liopetri; Cypriot intercommunal violence; Battle of Tylliria
- Georgios Grivas's voice The original speech Georgios Grivas (Leader of EOKA) gave to publicly signal the beginning of the campaign against British rule. Recorded 1 April 1955

Georgios Grivas (Greek: Γεώργιος Γρίβας; 6 June 1897 – 27 January 1974), also known by his nickname Digenis (Greek: Διγενής), was a Greek Cypriot officer of the Hellenic Army and founder and leader of the Greek and Greek Cypriot paramilitary organisations Organization X (1942–1949), EOKA (1955–1959) and EOKA B (1971–1974). He was also the Commander-in-Chief of the Armed Forces in Cyprus, then known as the Supreme Military Defence Command of Cyprus (ASDAK), which in the event of war would lead the Cyprus National Guard and the Hellenic Force in Cyprus (ELDYK).

A specialist in guerrilla and asymmetric warfare, he was one of the main actors in the Cypriot War of Independence, securing the independence of Cyprus against the British Empire. He died six months prior to the 1974 Cypriot coup and subsequent Turkish invasion of Cyprus.

== Early life ==
Grivas was born in Trikomo on 23 May 1897 Julian calendar, and was thought to be the fourth child of Greek Cypriot parents Kalomira Hatzimichael and Theodoros Grivas. (Nevertheless when he enrolled at the Hellenic Military Academy at the age of 19 he stated that his birthday was 23 May 1898 for unknown reasons). He grew up in Trikomo, after attending his village school, he studied at the Pancyprian Gymnasium in Nicosia from 1909 to 1915, living with his grandmother during this time in Chrysaliniotissa, Nicosia.

== Early military career ==
In 1916, Grivas moved to Greece; according to his obituary in The Times of London, he had left the family home after learning that his father intended him to become a physician. He took Greek citizenship and enrolled at the Hellenic Military Academy. He completed his military studies at the École Militaire in Paris. He graduated in 1919, and joined the Hellenic Army with the rank of Sub-Lieutenant and was immediately posted to the Asia Minor front of the Greco-Turkish War. He served in the Hellenic Army's 10th Division and participated in its advance from Smyrna to Panormos (today Bandirma) and Eskişehir, past Bursa and the Battle of Sakarya. With the subsequent retreat of the Hellenic Army from Asia Minor in 1922 (because of the Treaty of Lausanne), he was placed at Redestos in Thrace. He was decorated for his bravery and promoted to Lieutenant. He was later selected to study at the French Military Academy and upon his return to Greece he served in a number of posts, including that of a lecturer at the Hellenic Military Academy. He was promoted to captain in 1925 and to major in 1935. In 1938, he married Vasiliki Deka, the daughter of an Athenian pharmacist.

== World War II and German occupation ==
With the beginning of World War II, Grivas was transferred to the operations department of the central headquarters of the Hellenic Army, working on the strategic defensive plans for Northern Greece. When the Greco-Italian War broke out, Grivas was deployed to the Albanian front in December 1940, and served as Chief of Staff of the 2nd Division.

Following the German-Italian-Bulgarian occupation of Greece during World War II, Grivas founded and led the Organisation X, a guerrilla organisation made up of officers of the Greek Army, playing a role in the Greek Resistance to the Axis occupation of Greece. Its activities included spying for the Allied powers and launching attacks and sabotage operations against the occupiers. During the events of December 1944, members of Organisation X, using weapons recovered from the retreating Germans, fought at the Theseon alongside Greek and British monarchist forces to prevent EAM/ELAS fighters taking control of Athens.

In 1946, he retired from the Hellenic Army on his own request with subsequent attempts to enter politics being unsuccessful.

== The EOKA guerrilla campaign ==
One does not use a tank to catch field mice—a cat will do the job better.

— Grivas discussing British military strategies in his book Guerrilla Warfare and EOKA's Struggle: A Politicomilitary Study

Following his retirement, Grivas devoted his efforts to ridding Cyprus of British colonial rule and eventually uniting it with Greece (Enosis). As a member of the secret Committee for the Cyprus Struggle he took the oath of Enosis together with the newly elected Archbishop Makarios III, with whom he collaborated for preparing the armed struggle. He arrived secretly in Cyprus in October 1954 and began immediately the formation of his guerrilla organisation EOKA. On 1 April 1955 with a declaration that he signed as DIGENIS and a number of bombings against various targets in the four major cities and military installations, he announced the beginning of his campaign for self-determination through union with Greece.

He directed the first EOKA operations from his hideout in Nicosia but soon after he moved to the Troodos mountains to lead his guerrilla teams. At the time he wanted only British soldiers and their Greek collaborators to be targeted and prohibited attacks on the Turkish Cypriots. He recruited Grigoris Afxentiou as one of the team leaders, initially of the Famagusta district. Grivas escaped capture twice after he was surrounded by British forces at Spilia in December 1955, leading to the Battle of Spilia, and at Kykkos in May 1956. A month later, chased by the British forces, he was secretly transferred from the mountains by the car of a passionate EOKA fighter, Kostis Efstathiou, also known as "Pachykostis", and found refuge in a hideout at Limassol from where he directed not only the military activities but also the political campaign, since in March 1956 Archbishop Makarios was exiled by the authorities.

During the struggle, the British colonial administration had offered a reward of £10,000 plus passage to anywhere in the world for information leading to the arrest of Colonel Grivas.

== Return to Greece ==
With the signing of the Zurich-London agreements in early 1959 and the declaration of Cyprus as an independent state Grivas reluctantly ordered cease-fire. His views were at odds with those of Makarios who had accepted the above agreements on behalf of the Greek Cypriot population. In March 1959, Grivas came out of his hideout and departed (in exile, requested by the UK as part of the cease fire agreement) for Athens where he received a hero's welcome as the liberator of the Greek Cypriots and was subsequently decorated with the highest honours by the Greek Parliament and the Athens Academy and promoted to the rank of General. Not long after his return, Grivas was persuaded to enter politics as head of a coalition party but soon abandoned this route after the disappointing percentage his party obtained in the general election of 1963.

Grivas returned to Cyprus in 1964 after the outbreak of intercommunal violence between Turkish Cypriots and Greek Cypriots to take over the Supreme Command of the Greek Cypriot forces organised under the National Guard as well as the Greek military division sent to Cyprus by the government of George Papandreou to assist in the island's defence against a possible Turkish attack. He directed the construction of defence forts and complexes aiming at withstanding a Turkish invasion. On 15 November 1967, the Greek Cypriot National Guard under his direct command overran two small villages on the critical Larnaca-Limassol-Nicosia intersection in an operation known as Operation Gronthos, resulting in the deaths of 27 people, mostly armed Turkish Cypriots as well as Turkish Cypriot paramilitaries at Kofinou and Agios Theodoros. The immediate result of this event was Turkey's ultimatum, which prompted the Greek military government to recall both the Greek Division and General Grivas to Athens.

From 1968 to 1969, under strict surveillance, Grivas participated in a resistance movement aiming at deposing the ruling military junta and restoring democracy in Greece, along with a number of Greek Army officers including Colonel Dimitrios Opropoulos and Majors Spyros Moustaklis, Nikolaos Lytras and George Karousos as well as Greek Cypriot students and professionals many of them former EOKA fighters. Grivas began the formation of armed resistance cells in a number of neighbourhoods in Athens which were armed with guns and explosives that were brought in secretly from Cyprus. The organisation, however, was discovered by the authorities and many of its members were arrested.

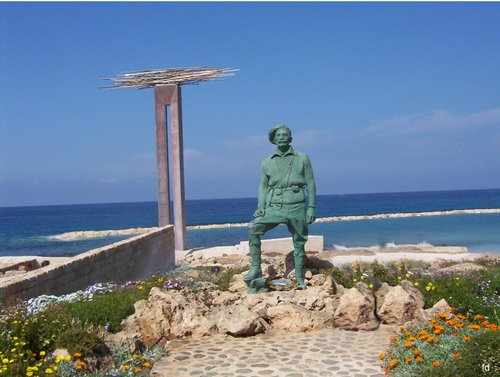
A monument to Georgios Grivas in Paphos

== Later life and death ==
After the discovery of Grivas' plans by the authorities, he secretly returned to Cyprus on 31 August 1971, where he formed the armed organisation EOKA B, which he used as leverage in his attempts to persuade or force Makarios to change his policy and adopt the line of "Self Determination – Union" with Greece. EOKA B did not overthrow Makarios but the armed struggle led to a vicious circle of violence and anti-violence that amounted to civil war among the Greek-Cypriot Community from 1971 to 1974.

While hiding at a house in Limassol on 27 January 1974, Grivas died of heart failure at the age of 76. The post-Grivas EOKA B then signed a secret agreement with Brigadier Dimitrios Ioannidis, the "invisible dictator" of Greece, and was controlled directly from Athens. Grivas' funeral and burial was held on 29 January 1974, in the garden of the house that had been Grivas' last hideout during the EOKA struggle (1955–1959) and was attended by tens of thousands of Greek Cypriots. Upon his death, the Cypriot Government declared a three-day official mourning and three days later, the Parliament of Cyprus declared General Grivas "A worthy son of the motherland". The government of Makarios, the target of Grivas' campaign for enosis, formally boycotted the event.

== Aftermath ==
The Second Junta of Greece, under Ioannidis, overthrew Makarios just six months after Grivas' death. Ioannidis had been planning to overthrow Makarios in spring 1974, but the final decision to act was made on 2 July 1974 after Makarios decided to directly oppose the Ioannidis regime by expelling from the Cypriot National Guard 550 Greek officers. That meant the loss of military control of Cyprus for Greece as well as the humiliation of Ioannidis. The coup d'état of 15 July 1974 that overthrew Makarios was executed by forces of the Cypriot National Guard under direct instructions from Greece. The National Guard was led by Greek officers and consisted of Greek-Cypriot conscripts. The EOKA B members and other pro-enosis forces joined the National Guard in the afternoon of Monday 15 July 1974 in the fight against Makarios' forces. The coup was swiftly followed by the Turkish invasion of Cyprus on 20 July. This invasion took Ioannides by surprise; he had failed to prepare Cyprus for a Turkish invasion and failed to coerce the Greek generals whom he had appointed to apply "Plan K" and provide military assistance to Cyprus. That prompted the downfall of Ioannidis.

== Sources ==
- Grivas-Digenis Georgios, Apomnimoneumata Agonos E.O.K.A. 1955–59, Athina 1961. third publishing, Athina 2013.
- Grivas-Digenis Georgios, Chronikon Agonos E.O.K.A. 1955–1959, Lefkosia 1971. second publishing, Lefkosia 1997
- Grivas George, General Grivas on Guerrilla Warfare. Translated by A. A. Palis, New York, N.Y., USA, Praeger, 1965
- Grivas George, Guerrilla warfare and EOKA's struggle: a politico-military study. (Translated by A. A. Pallis). London, G.B.: Longmans, Green, 1964
- Grivas George, The Memoirs of General Grivas. Edited by Charles Foley, New York, Frederick A. Praeger, 1965
- Papageorgiou Spyros, O Grivas kai i "X", To Chameno Archeio, Athens 2004
- Woodhouse, Christopher Montague (1948). Apple of Discord: A Survey of Recent Greek Politics in their International Setting. London
- H Tragiki Anametrisi kai i Prodosia tis Kyprou-Marios Adamides-Nicosia-2011-E-Book.
