= 1994–95 Cypriot Third Division =

Cypriot Third Division
- Season: 1994–95
- Champions: Ethnikos Latsion FC (1st title)
- Promoted: Ethnikos Latsion FC; Ayia Napa FC; Digenis Akritas Morphou FC; Chalkanoras Idaliou

The 1994–95 Cypriot Third Division was the 24th season of the Cypriot third-level football league. Ethnikos Latsion FC won their 1st title.

== Format ==
Fourteen teams participated in the 1994–95 Cypriot Third Division. All teams played against each other twice, once at their home and once away. The team with the most points at the end of the season crowned champions. The first four teams were promoted to the 1995–96 Cypriot Second Division.

=== Point system ===
Teams received three points for a win, one point for a draw and zero points for a loss.

== League standings ==
Pos	Team	Pld	W	D	L	GF	GA	GD	Pts	Promotion
1	Ethnikos Latsion FC	26	–	–	–	63	27	+36	58	Promoted to 1995–96 Cypriot Second Division
2	Ayia Napa FC	26	–	–	–	66	26	+40	55	Promoted to 1995–96 Cypriot Second Division
3	Digenis Akritas Morphou FC	26	–	–	–	56	16	+40	54	Promoted to 1995–96 Cypriot Second Division
4	Chalkanoras Idaliou	26	–	–	–	66	28	+38	51	Promoted to 1995–96 Cypriot Second Division
5	Ethnikos Assia FC	26	–	–	–	48	31	+17	47	Promoted to 1995–96 Cypriot Second Division
6	Ermis Aradippou FC	26	–	–	–	46	41	+5	34	
7	Achyronas Liopetriou	26	–	–	–	46	41	+5	34	
8	APEP Pelendriou	26	–	–	–	33	49	−16	33	
9	Elia Lythrodonta	26	–	–	–	28	42	−14	29	
10	Tsaggaris Peledriou	26	–	–	–	32	57	−25	25	
11	Orfeas Nicosia	26	–	–	–	23	41	−18	23	
12	AEK Katholiki	26	–	–	–	33	53	−20	23	
13	Digenis Akritas Ipsona	26	–	–	–	26	62	−36	16	
14	Fotiakos Frenarou	26	–	–	–	21	92	−71	12	

Rules for classification: 1) Points, 2) Goal differences, 3) Goal for

== Sources ==
- "Πανηγυρίζουν Λατσιά και Αγία Νάπα". Phileleftheros (in Greek). 1995-05-08. p. 13.

== See also ==
- Cypriot Third Division
- 1994–95 Cypriot First Division
- 1994–95 Cypriot Cup
