= Frenaros =

Frenaros: Φρέναρος (Greek); Frenaros (Turkish)
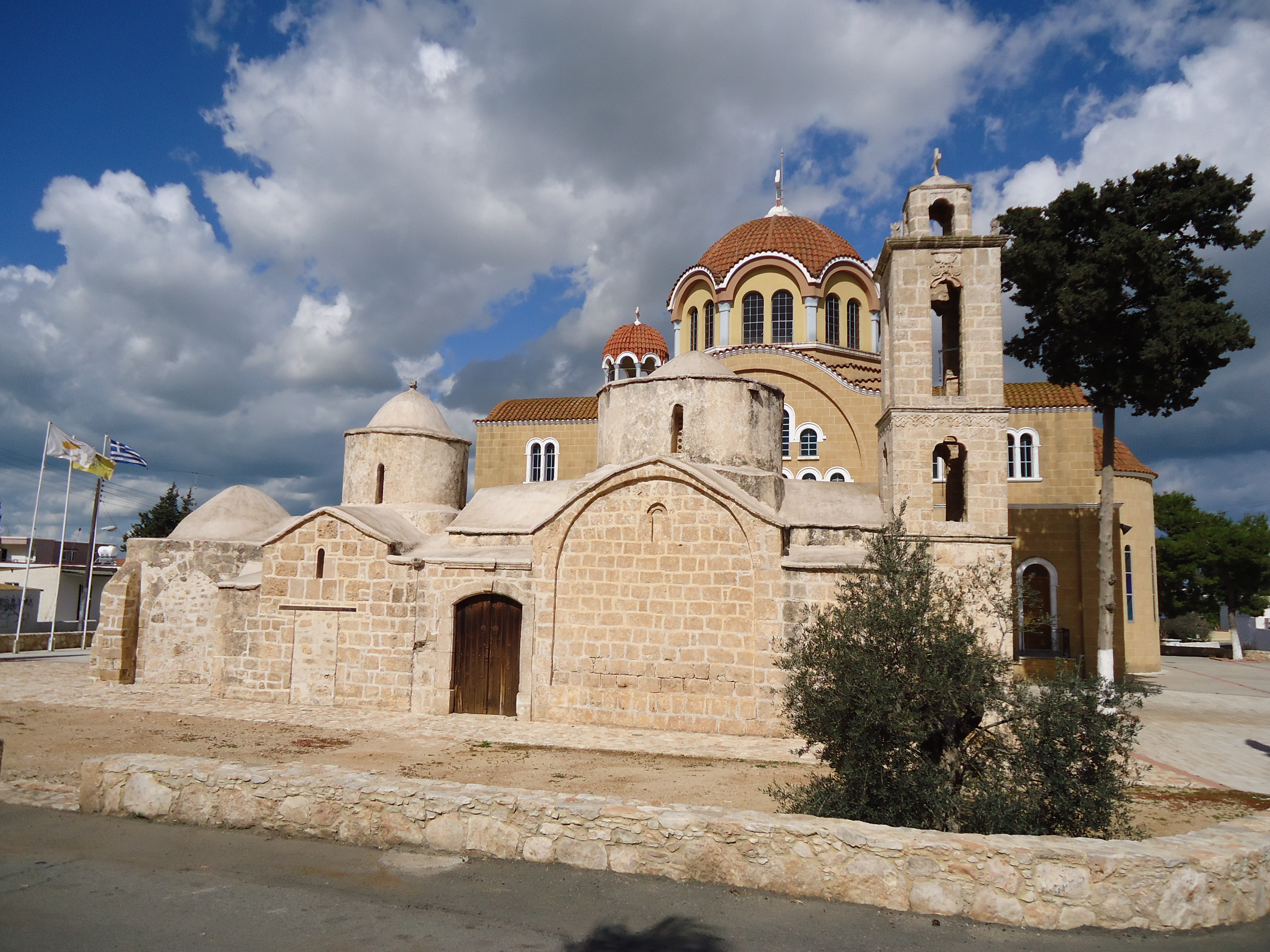
- The Old Church of Archangel Michael, with the newer and larger Church of Archangel Michael directly behind it

- Location in Cyprus
- Coordinates: 35°2′27″N 33°55′9″E
- Country: Cyprus
- District: Famagusta District

Population (2011)
  - Total: 4,298
- Time zone: UTC+2 (EET)
  - Summer (DST): UTC+3 (EEST)
- Website: phrenaros.org.cy

Frenaros (Greek: Φρέναρος, locally [ˈfrenːaɾos]; Turkish: Frenaros) is a village in Famagusta District, Cyprus, 6.4 km (4 mi) west of Paralimni and 14 km (9 mi) northwest of Ayia Napa. In 2011, it had a population of 4,298.

== Overview ==
Frenaros was named after the Fremenors, a group of Lusignan monks who lived in a nearby monastery. The earliest recorded reference to the village dates back to 1498, during the country's Venetian period. According to Venetian documents, the village was split into two villages whose names roughly translated to "Lower Frenaro" and "Upper Frenaro". The 1565 census marked the final instance of Frenaros being recorded as two separate villages rather than the single entity it is today. The village is named "Frinaria" on Venetian maps, first on a 1570 map by Giacomo Franco, with this name continuing on Venetian maps until 1785. The first mention of the village's name as "Frenaros" came from a 1738 map by English traveller Richard Pococke. In 1925, Swedish archeologist Einar Gjerstad uncovered evidence that the village was inhabited as early as the Neolithic period. During the early 20th century, English curator George H. E. Jeffery recorded the village's name as "Phrenaros" based on an 1888 map by Herbert Kitchener, 1st Earl Kitchener; this spelling is still occasionally used today despite the first modern Greek-language map of the area calling it "Frenaros".

In September 1958, Frenaros native and local primary school teacher Fotis Pittas became a famous name across the island when he was killed by British soldiers during the Cyprus Emergency. On the night of 1 September, Pittas travelled to neighbouring Liopetri to join three of his fellow EOKA members in a six-hour battle with over 200 members of the Royal Ulster Rifles; the conflict, now known as the Battle of Liopetri, ended when the British soldiers trapped the four men in a barn and burned it down. This led to Colonel Georgios Grivas ending a truce that had been in effect for a month. There is a bust of Pittas in the centre of Frenaros. The barn in Liopetri is now a national monument and includes a bronze statue of the four men.

Frenaros has two churches that date back to the 12th century; one of them, the Church of Archangel Michael, was built as a tribute to the other, now called the Old Church of Archangel Michael. The newer church is next to the older and much smaller one, which is closed to the public. The village has its own football team, Frenaros FC 2000, whose home ground is Frenaros Community Stadium. The stadium also hosts music concerts and events such as the annual Watermelon Festival, which attracts attendees from the surrounding areas. There is a large industrial estate on the outskirts of the village.

Frenaros and several nearby villages are collectively known as the Kokkinochoria (Κοκκινοχώρια), which translates to "red villages" due to their nutrient-dense red soil in which various fruits and vegetables are grown, especially potatoes that are extremely popular across the island. Frenaros is noted for its production of potatoes and watermelons, which contributed greatly to the village's growth and economy.

== Notable people ==
- Eleftheria Eleftheriou (born 1989), Greek Cypriot singer and actress, born and raised in Frenaros
- Fotis Pittas (1935–1958), Greek Cypriot EOKA member killed by British soldiers, born and raised in Frenaros
