= 1994–95 Cypriot First Division =

Cypriot First Division
- Season: 1994–95
- Champions: Anorthosis (7th title)
- Champions League: Anorthosis (qualifying round)
- UEFA Cup: Omonia (qualifying round)
- Cup Winners' Cup: APOEL (qualifying round; via Cypriot Cup)
- Intertoto Cup: Nea Salamina (group stage)
- Matches: 198
- Goals: 617 (3.12 per match)
- Top goalscorer: Pambis Andreou (25 goals)
- Biggest home win: Omonia 7–1 AEL Limassol
- Biggest away win: Ethnikos Achna 0–7 Anorthosis Famagusta
- Highest scoring: Anorthosis Famagusta 3–6 Omonia Aradippou

The 1994–95 Cypriot First Division was the 56th season of the Cypriot top-level football league. Anorthosis won their 7th title.

== Format ==
Twelve teams participated in the 1994–95 Cypriot First Division. The league consisted of three rounds with eleven match weeks in each round. In the first two rounds all teams played against each other twice, once at their home and once away.

The home teams for the third round matches were determined based on their league table position after the end of the second round as follows:

- The first placed team plays at home against 2nd, 3rd, 4th, 8th and 9th placed teams.
- The second placed team plays at home against 3rd, 4th, 5th, 9th and 10th place teams.
- The third placed team plays at home against 4th, 5th, 6th, 10th and 11th place teams.
- The fourth placed team plays at home against 5th, 6th, 7th, 11th and 12th place teams.
- The fifth placed team plays at home against 6th, 7th, 8th, 12th and 1st place teams.
- The sixth placed team plays at home against 7th, 8th, 9th, 1st and 2nd place teams.
- The seventh placed team plays at home against 8th, 9th, 10th, 1st, 2nd and 3rd place teams.
- The eighth placed team plays at home against 9th, 10th, 11th, 2nd, 3rd and 4th place teams.
- The ninth placed team plays at home against 10th, 11th, 12th, 3rd, 4th and 5th place teams.
- The tenth placed team plays at home against 11th, 12th, 1st, 4th, 5th and 6th place teams.
- The eleventh placed team plays at home against 12th, 1st, 2nd, 5th, 6th and 7th place teams.
- The twelfth placed team plays at home against 1st, 2nd, 3rd, 6th, 7th and 8th placed teams.

The team with the most points at the end of the season crowned champions. No team was relegated to the 1995–96 Cypriot Second Division.

The champions ensured their participation in the 1995–96 UEFA Champions League and the runners-up in the 1995–96 UEFA Cup. The third team ensured their participation in the 1995 UEFA Intertoto Cup.

=== Point system ===
Teams received three points for a win, one point for a draw and zero points for a loss.

== Changes from previous season ==
EPA Larnaca, Evagoras Paphos and APEP were relegated from previous season. Evagoras Paphos and APEP played in the 1994–95 Cypriot Second Division. They were replaced by the first team of the 1993–94 Cypriot Second Division, Aris Limassol.

Before the start of the season, Pezoporikos Larnaca and EPA Larnaca were merged forming AEK Larnaca, which took the place of Pezoporikos Larnaca in the Cypriot First Division.

== Stadia and locations ==
1994–95 Cypriot First Division

| Club | Venue |
|---|---|
| ΑΕΚ | GSZ Stadium |
| AEL | Tsirion Stadium |
| Anorthosis | Antonis Papadopoulos Stadium |
| APOEL | Makario Stadium |
| Apollon | Tsirion Stadium |
| Aris | Tsirion Stadium |
| Ethnikos | Dasaki Stadium |
| Enosis | Paralimni Municipal Stadium |
| Nea Salamina | Ammochostos Stadium |
| Olympiakos | Makario Stadium |
| Omonia Ar. | Aradippou Municipal Stadium |
| Omonia | Makario Stadium |

== League standings ==
| Pos | Team | Pld | W | D | L | GF | GA | GD | Pts | Qualification |
|---|---|---|---|---|---|---|---|---|---|---|
| 1 | Anorthosis Famagusta (C) | 33 | 22 | 7 | 4 | 71 | 25 | +46 | 73 | Qualification for Champions League qualifying round |
| 2 | Omonia | 33 | 20 | 7 | 6 | 82 | 32 | +50 | 67 | Qualification for UEFA Cup preliminary round |
| 3 | Nea Salamis Famagusta | 33 | 17 | 6 | 10 | 59 | 50 | +9 | 57 | Qualification for Intertoto Cup group stage |
| 4 | Ethnikos Achna | 33 | 14 | 5 | 14 | 52 | 59 | −7 | 47 | |
| 5 | APOEL | 33 | 13 | 7 | 13 | 43 | 43 | 0 | 46 | Qualification for Cup Winners' Cup qualifying round |
| 6 | Apollon Limassol | 33 | 13 | 6 | 14 | 50 | 46 | +4 | 45 | |
| 7 | Enosis Neon Paralimni | 33 | 12 | 9 | 12 | 44 | 49 | −5 | 45 | |
| 8 | Olympiakos Nicosia | 33 | 13 | 5 | 15 | 41 | 65 | −24 | 44 | |
| 9 | AEK Larnaca | 33 | 12 | 6 | 15 | 50 | 48 | +2 | 42 | |
| 10 | AEL Limassol | 33 | 12 | 5 | 16 | 44 | 57 | −13 | 41 | |
| 11 | Aris Limassol | 33 | 10 | 7 | 16 | 44 | 49 | −5 | 37 | |
| 12 | Omonia Aradippou | 33 | 3 | 4 | 26 | 37 | 94 | −57 | 13 | |

Rules for classification: 1) Points, 2) Goal differences, 3) Goals for.
(C) Champions

== Results ==
=== First and second round ===
| Home \ Away | AEK | AEL | ANR | APN | APL | ARS | ETH | ENP | NSL | OLY | OMA | OMN |
|---|---|---|---|---|---|---|---|---|---|---|---|---|
| AEK | | 1–1 | 1–2 | 3–2 | 1–0 | 2–0 | 3–0 | 2–0 | 1–0 | 1–3 | 2–1 | 0–1 |
| AEL | 2–1 | | 0–0 | 2–1 | 2–0 | 2–0 | 3–2 | 1–1 | 0–2 | 0–1 | 1–2 | 0–1 |
| Anorthosis | 3–0 | 3–0 | | 3–0 | 2–1 | 2–2 | 2–1 | 3–0 | 3–1 | 5–0 | 4–1 | 2–2 |
| APOEL | 1–0 | 1–1 | 1–1 | | 0–2 | 1–0 | 0–1 | 1–0 | 0–0 | 3–1 | 3–1 | 1–1 |
| Apollon | 1–0 | 3–0 | 0–1 | 0–1 | | 2–0 | 1–2 | 1–1 | 1–0 | 0–2 | 2–0 | 0–0 |
| Aris | 1–1 | 0–1 | 0–1 | 0–1 | 3–3 | | 0–1 | 0–0 | 1–2 | 1–2 | 1–2 | 1–0 |
| Ethnikos | 1–0 | 1–2 | 1–0 | 1–1 | 1–2 | 1–1 | | 1–1 | 4–2 | 3–1 | 5–0 | 1–4 |
| ENP | 2–1 | 4–2 | 0–1 | 2–1 | 2–2 | 3–1 | 1–1 | | 3–1 | 3–0 | 4–1 | 1–4 |
| Nea Salamina | 1–0 | 4–3 | 3–0 | 4–2 | 0–0 | 2–0 | 2–1 | 2–0 | | 2–1 | 4–2 | 1–0 |
| Olympiakos | 3–1 | 3–1 | 1–0 | 0–0 | 1–5 | 1–3 | 2–1 | 2–1 | 1–1 | | 3–1 | 1–4 |
| Omonia Ar. | 2–2 | 1–2 | 3–6 | 1–2 | 1–2 | 2–2 | 3–0 | 1–3 | 2–6 | 1–1 | | 0–3 |
| Omonia | 2–2 | 7–1 | 1–1 | 5–2 | 1–1 | 3–0 | 2–1 | 5–0 | 3–0 | 3–0 | 5–1 | |

Legend: Blue = home team win; Yellow = draw; Red = away team win.

=== Third round ===
| Home \ Away | AEK | AEL | ANR | APN | APL | ARS | ETH | ENP | NSL | OLY | OMA | OMN |
|---|---|---|---|---|---|---|---|---|---|---|---|---|
| AEK | | | | | 4–1 | 1–4 | | 2–2 | | 4–0 | 5–0 | 2–1 |
| AEL | 6–0 | | | | 3–1 | 0–1 | | | 2–2 | 1–3 | 1–0 | |
| Anorthosis | 0–0 | 1–0 | | | 3–1 | | | | 3–1 | 3–0 | | |
| APOEL | 3–1 | 3–0 | 0–1 | | | | 2–3 | | 1–0 | | | 3–3 |
| Apollon | | | | 3–0 | | 2–4 | | 4–1 | | 4–1 | 4–2 | |
| Aris | | | 1–1 | 1–0 | | | | 3–0 | | 1–2 | 4–1 | 2–1 |
| Ethnikos | 0–5 | 3–1 | 0–7 | | 2–0 | 2–4 | | | 4–1 | | | |
| ENP | | 2–0 | 1–2 | 1–0 | | | 1–1 | | | | | 1–0 |
| Nea Salamina | 2–1 | | | | 2–1 | 4–2 | | 3–1 | | 1–1 | | |
| Olympiakos | | | | 0–3 | | | 2–3 | 0–0 | | | 1–0 | 1–5 |
| Omonia Ar. | | | 1–5 | 1–3 | | | 0–2 | 0–2 | 2–2 | | | 1–2 |
| Omonia | | 2–3 | 1–0 | | 3–0 | | 3–1 | | 4–1 | | | |

Legend: Blue = home team win; Yellow = draw; Red = away team win.

== See also ==
- Cypriot First Division
- 1994–95 Cypriot Cup
- List of top goalscorers in Cypriot First Division by season
- Cypriot football clubs in European competitions

== Sources ==
- "1994/95 Cypriot First Division". Rec.Sport.Soccer Statistics Foundation. 2016-01-14.
