= Irish security forces =

Military of Ireland
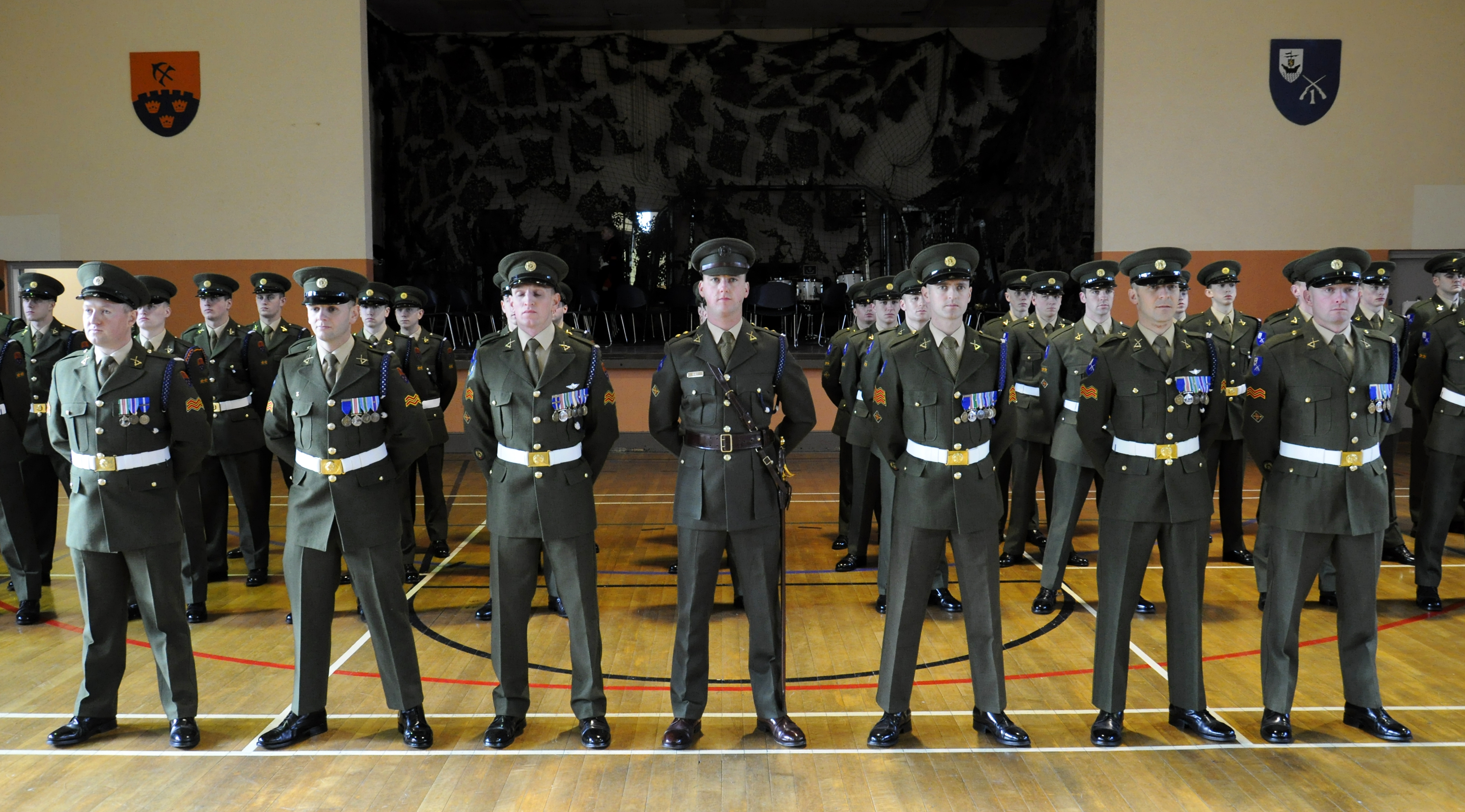
- Irish Army recruit platoon

Irish security forces refer to the various security forces of Ireland. Among other roles, they carry out efforts to undermine the ongoing dissident Irish republican campaign since the Troubles. They consist of the following organisations;

Department of Defence

- Defence Forces
  - Army
    - Army Ranger Wing (ARW)
    - Ordnance Corps Explosive Ordnance Disposal (EOD)
  - Air Corps
  - Naval Service
  - Directorate of Military Intelligence (G2/J2)
    - National Security Intelligence Section (NSIS)
    - Defence Intelligence Section (DI)
  - Communications and Information Services Corps (CIS) SIGINT
  - Military Police Corps

Department of Justice, Home Affairs and Migration

- Garda Síochána
  - Crime and Security Branch (CSB)
    - Special Detective Unit (SDU)
      - Emergency Response Unit (ERU)
    - National Surveillance Unit (NSU)
- Airport Police Service
- Dublin Harbour Police
- Dún Laoghaire Harbour Police

Department of Finance

- Revenue Commissioners
  - Customs

Department of Climate, Energy and the Environment

- National Cyber Security Centre

Department of Enterprise, Tourism and Employment

- Corporate Enforcement Authority

== See also ==
- National Security Committee (NSC)
- Law enforcement in Ireland
- Law enforcement in the Republic of Ireland
