= Outline of the Republic of Ireland =

Country in Northwestern Europe

The Flag of Ireland

The location of Ireland in Europe The Republic of Ireland Other members of the European Union

The following outline is provided as an overview of and topical guide to Ireland:

Republic of Ireland – country in north-western Europe consisting of 26 of the 32 counties of the island of Ireland. The capital and largest city is Dublin, on the eastern side of the island. It shares its only land border with Northern Ireland, which is part of the United Kingdom. It is otherwise surrounded by the Atlantic Ocean, with the Celtic Sea to the south, St George's Channel to the south-east, and the Irish Sea to the east. It is a unitary, parliamentary republic.

Ireland is one of the richest, most developed and peaceful countries on earth, having the fifth highest gross domestic product per capita, second highest gross domestic product (purchasing power parity) per capita and having the fifth highest Human Development Index rank. The country also has the highest quality of life in the world, ranking first in the Economist Intelligence Unit's Quality-of-life index. Ireland was ranked fourth on the Global Peace Index. Ireland also has high rankings for its education system, political freedom and civil rights, press freedom and economic freedom; it consistently ranks near the bottom of the Failed States Index, being one of the few "sustainable" states in the world.

Ireland is a member of the EU, the OECD and the UN. Ireland's policy of neutrality means it is not a member of NATO. Ireland participates in a number of cross-border bodies with the United Kingdom as a result of the Good Friday Agreement/Belfast Agreement, and certain government functions, including tourism, food safety and inland waterways, are partially run on an all-island basis.

Note that many geographic and cultural articles on Ireland consider the island of Ireland as a whole, including Northern Ireland, which is part of the United Kingdom. Where no distinct article for the Irish state is available, this outline gives the relevant article for the entire island.

== General reference ==
An enlargeable basic map of Ireland

- Pronunciation: /ˈaɪərlənd/
- Common English country name: Ireland
- Official English country name: Ireland
- Common endonym(s): Éire, Ireland
- Official endonym(s): Éire, Ireland
- Adjectival(s): Irish
- Demonym(s): Irish
- Etymology: Name of Ireland
- ISO country codes: IE, IRL, 372
- ISO region codes: See ISO 3166-2:IE
- Internet country code top-level domain: .ie

== Geography of Ireland ==
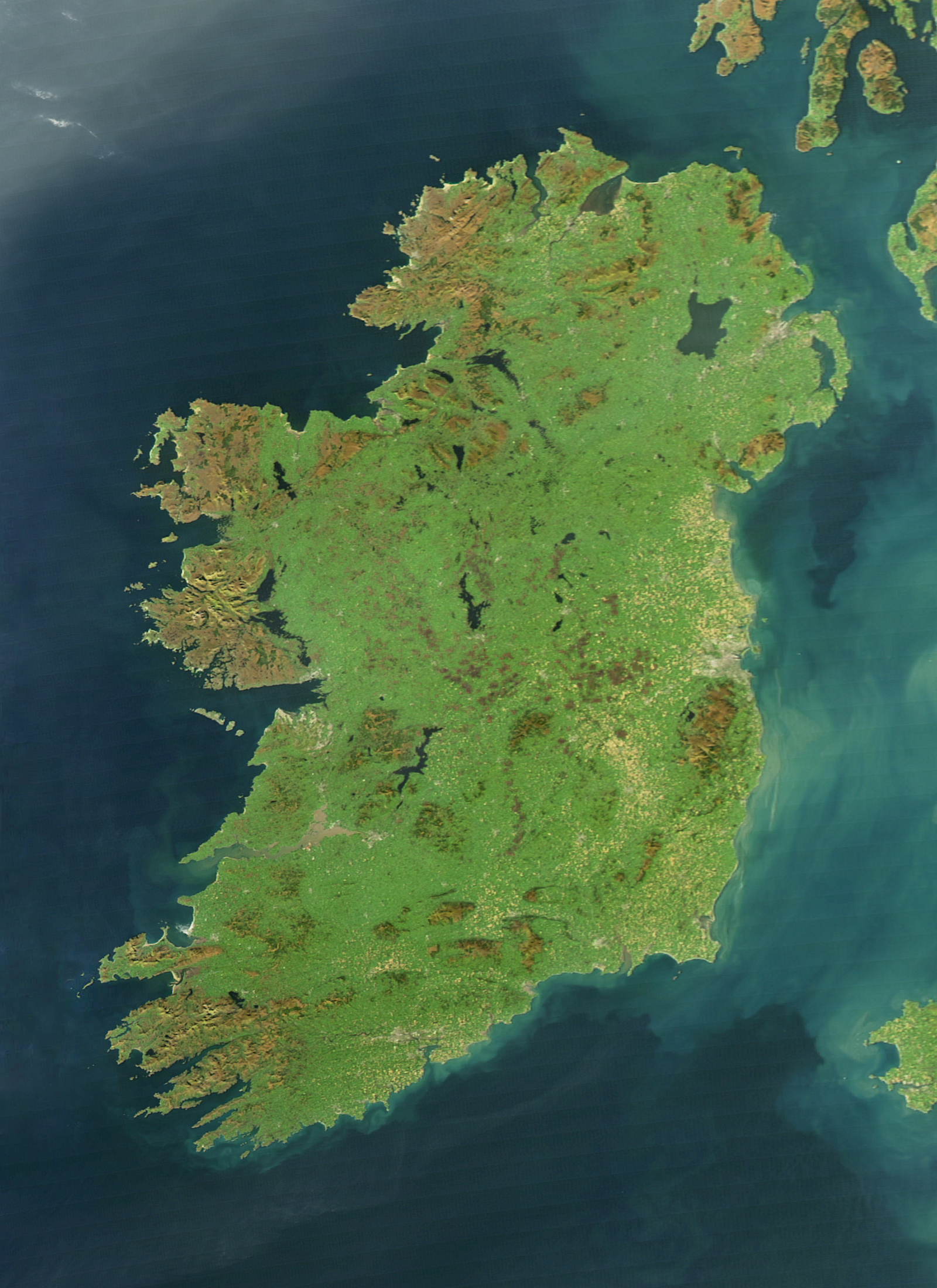
An enlargeable satellite image of the island of Ireland

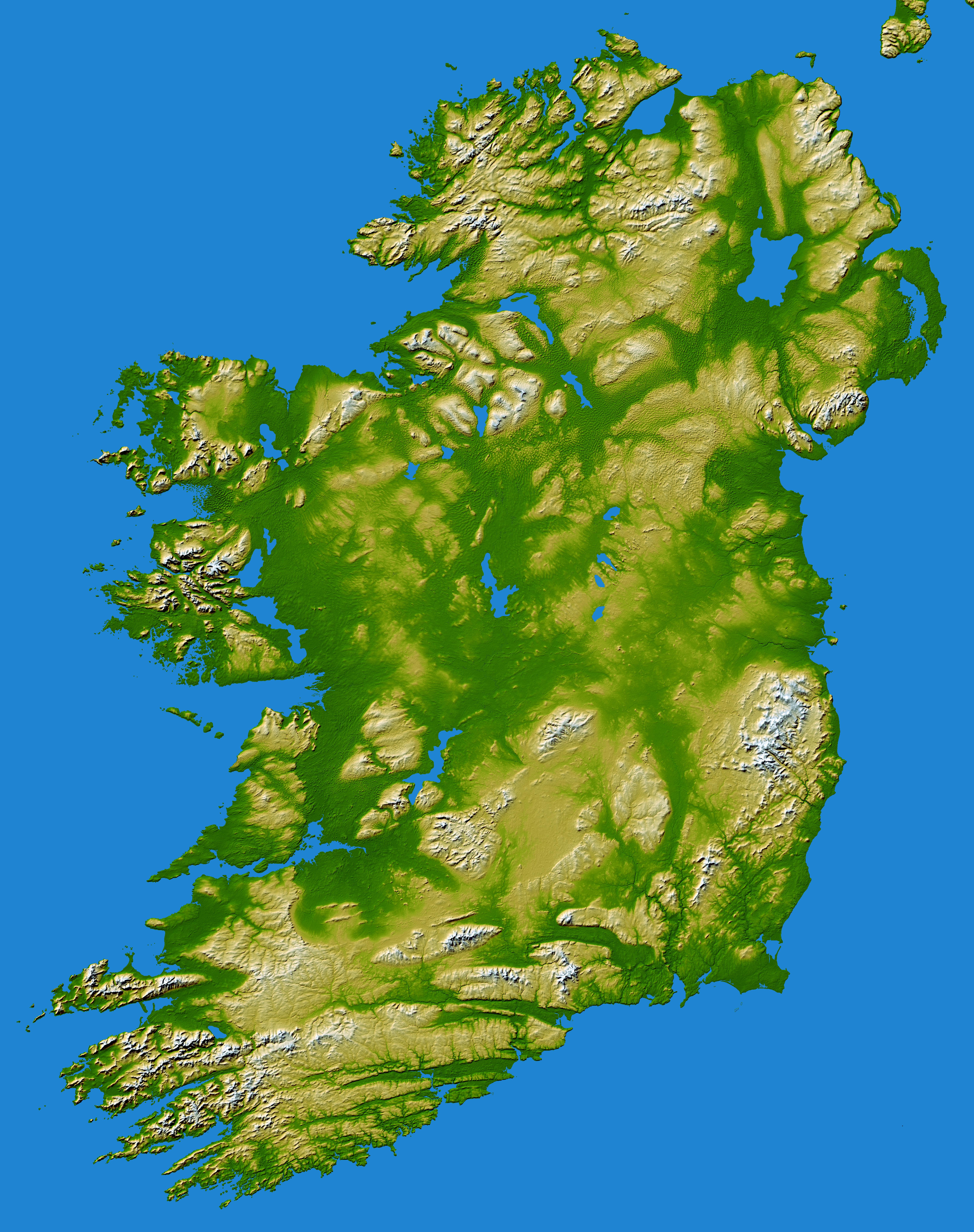
An enlargeable topographic map of the island of Ireland

Geography of Ireland

- Ireland is: a country, on an island
- Location:
  - Northern Hemisphere and Western Hemisphere
  - Atlantic Ocean
  - Eurasia
    - Europe
      - Northern Europe
      - Western Europe
        - British Isles
          - Ireland (the island)
            - Ireland (the sovereign state)
            - Northern Ireland
  - Time zone: Western European Time (UTC+00), Irish Standard Time = Western European Summer Time (UTC+01)
  - Extreme points of Ireland
    - High: Carrauntoohil 1,038 m (3,406 ft)
    - Low: North Atlantic Ocean 0 m
  - Land boundaries: United Kingdom 360 km
  - Coastline: 1,448 km
- Population: 5,149,139 people (2022 census) – 119th most populous country
- Area: 70,273 km^{2} (27,133 sq mi) – 120th largest country
- Atlas of Ireland

=== Environment of Ireland ===
- Climate of Ireland
- Environmental issues in Ireland
- Renewable energy in Ireland
- Geology of Ireland
- Protected areas of Ireland
  - Biosphere reserves in Ireland: North Bull Island, Killarney National Park
  - National parks of Ireland
  - Special Protection Areas in Ireland
- Fauna of Ireland
  - Birds of Ireland
  - Mammals of Ireland
- Flora of Ireland

==== Natural geographic features of Ireland ====
- Islands of Ireland
- Mountains of Ireland
- Rivers of Ireland
- Lakes of Ireland
- World Heritage Sites in Ireland

=== Regions of Ireland ===
List of regions of the Republic of Ireland

- Regional Assemblies in Ireland
- Provinces of Ireland (including Northern Ireland)

==== Administrative divisions of Ireland ====
Local government in the Republic of Ireland

- Counties of Ireland
  - Municipalities of Ireland

===== Counties of Ireland =====
Clickable map of the counties of Ireland

Counties of Ireland

The counties of the Republic of Ireland:

- County Carlow
- County Cavan
- County Clare
- County Cork
- County Donegal
- County Dublin
- County Galway
- County Kerry
- County Kildare
- County Kilkenny
- County Laois
- County Leitrim
- County Limerick
- County Longford
- County Louth
- County Mayo
- County Meath
- County Monaghan
- County Offaly
- County Roscommon
- County Sligo
- County Tipperary
- County Waterford
- County Westmeath
- County Wexford
- County Wicklow

The counties arranged in other ways:

- List of Irish counties by population
- List of Irish counties by area

===== Municipalities of Ireland =====
Municipalities of Ireland

- Cities of Ireland
  - Capital of Ireland: Dublin

=== Demography of Ireland ===
Demographics of the Republic of Ireland

== Government and politics of Ireland ==
The Coat of arms of Ireland

- Form of government: parliamentary representative democratic republic
- Capital of Ireland: Dublin
- Elections in the Republic of Ireland
- Political parties in Ireland
- Political scandals of Ireland
- Taxation in Ireland

=== Branches of the government of Ireland ===
Government of Ireland

==== Executive branch of the government of Ireland ====
- Head of state: President of Ireland, Catherine Connolly
- Head of government: Taoiseach (Prime Minister), Micheál Martin
  - Tánaiste (Deputy Prime Minister), Simon Harris
- Government of Ireland
  - Minister for Agriculture, Food and the Marine
  - Minister for Children, Disability and Equality
  - Minister for Defence
  - Minister for Education and Youth
  - Minister for Enterprise, Tourism and Employment
  - Minister for Climate, Energy and the Environment
  - Minister for Culture, Communications and Sport
  - Minister for Finance
  - Minister for Foreign Affairs and Trade
  - Minister for Further and Higher Education, Research, Innovation and Science
  - Minister for Health
  - Minister for Housing, Local Government and Heritage
  - Minister for Justice, Home Affairs and Migration
  - Minister for Public Expenditure, Infrastructure, Public Service Reform and Digitalisation
  - Minister for Rural and Community Development and the Gaeltacht
  - Minister for Social Protection
  - Minister for Transport
- State-sponsored bodies of the Republic of Ireland
- Civil service of the Republic of Ireland

==== Legislative branch of the government of Ireland ====
- Oireachtas (bicameral parliament)
  - The President of Ireland
  - The two Houses of the Oireachtas (Irish: Tithe an Oireachtais):
    - Upper house: Seanad Éireann
    - Lower house: Dáil Éireann

==== Judicial branch of the government of Ireland ====
- Supreme Court of Ireland
- Court of Appeal
- High Court of Ireland
- Special Criminal Court
- District Court
- Circuit Court

=== Foreign relations of Ireland ===
- Diplomatic missions in Ireland
- Diplomatic missions of Ireland
- Ireland–United Kingdom relations

==== International organisation membership ====
International organization membership of Ireland Ireland is a member of:

- Asian Development Bank (ADB) (nonregional member)
- Australia Group
- Bank for International Settlements (BIS)
- British-Irish Council (BIC)
- Council of Europe (CE)
- Economic and Monetary Union (EMU)
- Euro-Atlantic Partnership Council (EAPC)
- European Bank for Reconstruction and Development (EBRD)
- European Investment Bank (EIB)
- European Space Agency (ESA)
- European Union (EU)
- Food and Agriculture Organization (FAO)
- International Atomic Energy Agency (IAEA)
- International Bank for Reconstruction and Development (IBRD)
- International Chamber of Commerce (ICC)
- International Civil Aviation Organization (ICAO)
- International Criminal Court (ICCt)
- International Criminal Police Organization (Interpol)
- International Development Association (IDA)
- International Energy Agency (IEA)
- International Federation of Red Cross and Red Crescent Societies (IFRCS)
- International Finance Corporation (IFC)
- International Fund for Agricultural Development (IFAD)
- International Hydrographic Organization (IHO)
- International Labour Organization (ILO)
- International Maritime Organization (IMO)
- International Monetary Fund (IMF)
- International Olympic Committee (IOC)
- International Organization for Migration (IOM)
- International Organization for Standardization (ISO)
- International Red Cross and Red Crescent Movement (ICRM)
- International Telecommunication Union (ITU)
- International Telecommunications Satellite Organization (ITSO)

- International Trade Union Confederation (ITUC)
- Inter-Parliamentary Union (IPU)
- Multilateral Investment Guarantee Agency (MIGA)
- Nuclear Energy Agency (NEA)
- Nuclear Suppliers Group (NSG)
- Organisation for Economic Co-operation and Development (OECD)
- Organization for Security and Cooperation in Europe (OSCE)
- Organisation for the Prohibition of Chemical Weapons (OPCW)
- Organization of American States (OAS) (observer)
- Paris Club
- Partnership for Peace (PFP)
- Permanent Court of Arbitration (PCA)
- United Nations (UN)
- United Nations Conference on Trade and Development (UNCTAD)
- United Nations Educational, Scientific, and Cultural Organization (UNESCO)
- United Nations High Commissioner for Refugees (UNHCR)
- United Nations Industrial Development Organization (UNIDO)
- United Nations Interim Force in Lebanon (UNIFIL)
- United Nations Mission for the Referendum in Western Sahara (MINURSO)
- United Nations Mission in Liberia (UNMIL)
- United Nations Operation in Cote d'Ivoire (UNOCI)
- United Nations Organization Mission in the Democratic Republic of the Congo (MONUC)
- United Nations Truce Supervision Organization (UNTSO)
- Universal Postal Union (UPU)
- Western European Union (WEU) (observer)
- World Customs Organization (WCO)
- World Federation of Trade Unions (WFTU)
- World Health Organization (WHO)
- World Intellectual Property Organization (WIPO)
- World Meteorological Organization (WMO)
- World Trade Organization (WTO)
- Zangger Committee (ZC)

=== Law and order in Ireland ===
- Capital punishment in Ireland
- Constitution of Ireland
- Crime in Ireland
- Human rights in Ireland
  - LGBT rights in the Republic of Ireland
  - Freedom of religion in Ireland
- Law enforcement in Ireland
  - National law enforcement agencies
    - Airport Police
    - Garda Síochána (National police force)
    - Garda Síochána Reserve
  - Local law enforcement agencies
    - Dublin Harbour Police
    - Dún Laoghaire Harbour Police

=== Military of Ireland ===
- Command
  - Supreme Commander of the Defence Forces: President of Ireland, Catherine Connolly
    - Irish Department of Defence
- Forces
  - Permanent Defence Forces
    - Irish Army
    - Naval Service
    - Irish Air Force
    - Special forces
  - Reserve Defence Forces
    - Army Reserve (formerly An Fórsa Cosanta Áitiúil)
    - Naval Service Reserve (formerly An Slua Muirí)
    - Military Police
- Military history of Ireland

=== Local government in Ireland ===
Local government in the Republic of Ireland

== History of Ireland ==
- History of Ireland (including Northern Ireland)
- History of the Republic of Ireland
- Timeline of the history of Ireland
- Military history of Ireland

== Culture of Ireland ==
- Architecture of Ireland
- Cuisine of Ireland
- Festivals in Ireland
- Languages of Ireland
- Media of the Republic of Ireland
  - Coat of arms of Ireland
  - Flag of Ireland
  - Coat of arms of Ireland
  - National anthem of Ireland: Amhrán na bhFiann
- People of Ireland
- Prostitution in Ireland
- Public holidays in Ireland
- Religion in the Republic of Ireland
  - Christianity in Ireland
  - Hinduism in the Republic of Ireland
  - Islam in Ireland
    - Ahmadiyya in Ireland
  - Judaism in Ireland
  - Sikhism in Ireland
- World Heritage Sites in Ireland

=== Art in Ireland ===
- Art in Ireland
- Cinema of Ireland
- Literature of Ireland
- Music of Ireland
- Television in Ireland
- Theatre in Ireland

=== Sports in Ireland ===
- Association football in the Republic of Ireland
- Gaelic football
- Rugby league in Ireland
- Rugby union in Ireland
- Hurling

== Economy and infrastructure of Ireland ==
- Economic rank, by nominal GDP (2007): 32nd (thirty-second)
- Agriculture in Ireland
- Banking in Ireland
  - Central Bank of Ireland
- Communications in Ireland
  - Internet in Ireland
- Companies of Ireland
- Currency of Ireland: Euro (see also: Euro topics)
  - ISO 4217: EUR
- Economic history of Ireland
- Energy in Ireland
  - Energy policy of Ireland
- Health care in Ireland
- Mining in Ireland
- Irish Stock Exchange
- Tourism in Ireland
- Transport in Ireland
  - Airports in Ireland
  - Rail transport in Ireland
  - Roads in Ireland
- Water supply and sanitation in the Republic of Ireland

== Education in Ireland ==
- List of schools in the Republic of Ireland
  - List of schools in County Dublin
- List of higher education institutions in the Republic of Ireland

== See also ==
- Republic of Ireland
- Island of Ireland
- List of international rankings
- List of Ireland-related topics
- Member state of the European Union
- Member state of the United Nations
- Outline of Europe
- Outline of geography
