= Law enforcement in the Republic of Ireland =

Crime in Republic of Ireland
- Homicide: 0.7 (2024)
- Assault: 109.9 (2023)
- Burglary: 177.7 (2024)
- Theft: 1359.3 (2024)
- Fraud: 219.0 (2024)
- Corruption: 0.1 (2024)
- Money laundering: 11.6 (2024)
- Rape: 19.3 (2023)
- Sexual violence: 56.6 (2023)
- reported per 100,000 inhabitants

Law enforcement in the Republic of Ireland is the responsibility of Ireland's civilian police force, the Garda Síochána, commonly referred to as the Gardaí or the Guards. It is responsible for all civil policing within the country and has been the only territorial police force since their merger with the Dublin Metropolitan Police in 1925.

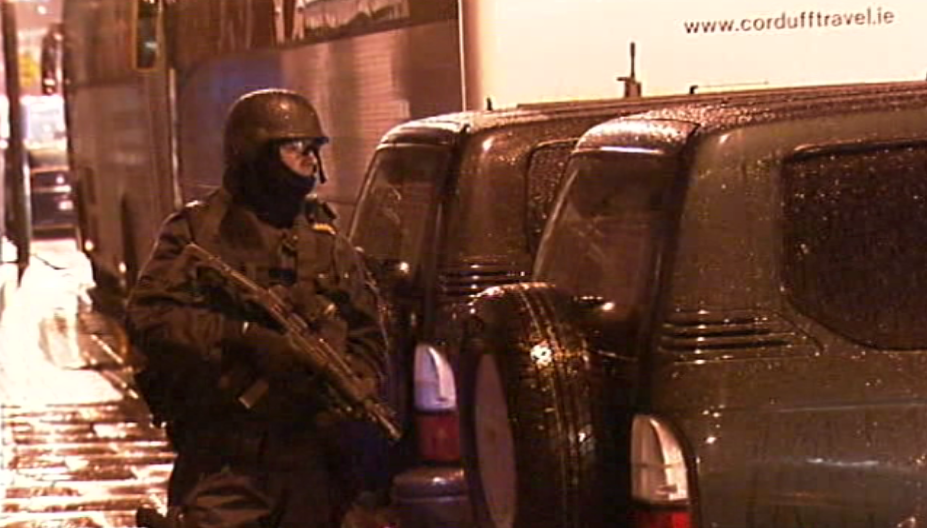
Garda Síochána Emergency Response Unit armed with an UZI sub machinegun on duty in Dublin

== Garda Síochána ==
The Garda Síochána are responsible for national and local policing in Ireland. The service is headed by the Garda Commissioner who is appointed by the Government of Ireland. Its headquarters are located in Phoenix Park in Dublin.

The Garda Síochána Reserve is the volunteer reserve section of the Gardaí. Its purpose is to supplement the work of members of the Garda Síochána in performing its functions.

== Military Police Corps ==
The Military Police Corps is the corps of the Irish Army responsible for the provision of policing service personnel and providing a military police presence to forces while on exercise and deployment. Its tasks increase during wartime to include traffic control organisation and POW and refugee control. The Military Police Corps are distinguished from other units by their wearing of a red beret.

The Military Police Corps enjoy a close working relationship with the Garda Síochána at both national and local levels, with the Gardaí providing specialist training to the Corps in criminal investigation.

== Airport and Harbour policing ==
Within Dublin Airport, Cork Airport, and Shannon Airport, the Airport Police Service perform aviation security functions. They are employed by Dublin Airport Authority and authorised by the Minister for Transport, Tourism and Sport.

Within Dublin Port and Dún Laoghaire Harbour, the Dublin Harbour Police and the Dún Laoghaire Harbour Police (operated by the Dublin Port Company & Dún Laoghaire harbour company respectively) perform a similar role to the Airport Police Service.

The powers of these organisations are limited to the airport/port buildings and grounds.

== Special police organisations ==
The Special Detective Unit (SDU) is a unit of the Garda Síochána under its Crime & Security Branch (CSB). Their responsibilities include counter-terrorism, counter-espionage, providing an armed response to incidents, protection of the State, protection of cash shipments, monitoring the activities of subversive and extremist groups, protection of VIPs and operation of the Witness Security Program.

=== Revenue Customs ===
The Office of the Revenue Commissioners operate a customs service at all major ports of entry to Ireland and are mandated to stop all illegal narcotics and firearms from entering the state. Authorised officers have a wide range of powers including arrest under the Customs Consolidation Act 1876 (39 & 40 Vict. c. 36) and the Finance Act 2005. They are also authorised to investigate revenue offences under the Taxes Consolidation Act 1997.
