= Law enforcement in Ireland =

This is a description of law enforcement in Northern Ireland and the Republic of Ireland. Before the Republic (then called the Irish Free State) left the union in 1922, one police force — the Royal Irish Constabulary — policed almost the whole island (aside from Dublin, where the Dublin Metropolitan Police were the main force; Belfast, where the Belfast Borough Police were the main force; and the borough of Londonderry, where the Londonderry Borough Police were the main force before merging with the RIC).

The Royal Ulster Constabulary (RUC) was the direct descent of the force. In 2001, the RUC was replaced with the Police Service of Northern Ireland (PSNI), while a new police force — the Garda Síochána — was set up in the Irish Free State (Republic of Ireland since 1949) in 1949. Today, due to the sharing of a land border and legislation introduced to both countries after the Belfast Agreement of 1998, there is cooperation between the main police forces of jurisdictions.

== Republic of Ireland ==
The Republic of Ireland has a single national civilian police force, the Garda Síochána (Guardians of the Peace). This force is responsible for all aspects of territorial civil policing. The Garda Síochána have been the only territorial police force in the Republic since the disbandment of the Civic Guard gendarmery in 1922, and the incorporation of the Dublin Metropolitan Police in 1925.

In addition to the Gardaí, other policing bodies include:

- Military Police Corps, the military police corps of the Irish Army,
- Airport Police Service who perform aviation policing functions at Dublin, Cork and Shannon airports,
- Dublin Harbour Police and Dún Laoghaire Harbour Police.

== Northern Ireland ==
Law enforcement in Northern Ireland follows a similar model to that of the rest of the United Kingdom in that it is the responsibility of the local territorial police force. However unlike England and Wales, which have police forces divided by local areas such as ceremonial counties or local council areas, Northern Ireland (like Scotland) has a single territorial police force, the Police Service of Northern Ireland (PSNI), formerly known as the Royal Ulster Constabulary (RUC). This force, one of the largest geographically in the UK, is responsible for all local policing in the province.

In addition to the PSNI, there are other agencies which have responsibility for specific parts of Northern Ireland's transport infrastructure:

- Belfast Harbour Police
- Belfast International Airport Constabulary

Officers of these forces have full constabulary powers within one mile of the specific locations they police, which come from specific pieces of legislation relating to them.

A further civilian police force with powers in Northern Ireland is the Ministry of Defence Police, which has responsibility for policing all MOD property; they are assisted in this by the Northern Ireland Security Guard Service. Additionally, the Royal Military Police has a presence in British Army barracks.

== See also ==
- List of defunct law enforcement agencies in the United Kingdom
