= Apdu =

Apdu or APDU may refer to:

- Airport Police Dog Unit, Ireland
- Asia Pacific Democracy Union, is a regional political association
- Gamma Trianguli, a star also named Apdu
- Smart card application protocol data unit (APDU)
