= Dublin Harbour =

Dublin Harbour may refer to:

- Dublin Bay, bay of the Irish Sea around Dublin city
- Dublin Port, the port of the city of Dublin, Ireland
- Dublin Harbour (UK Parliament constituency), a constituency of the UK Parliament 1855–1922, and of Dáil Éireann 1918–1921

== See also ==
- Dublin Harbour Police, associated with Dublin Port
