= Dún Laoghaire Harbour =

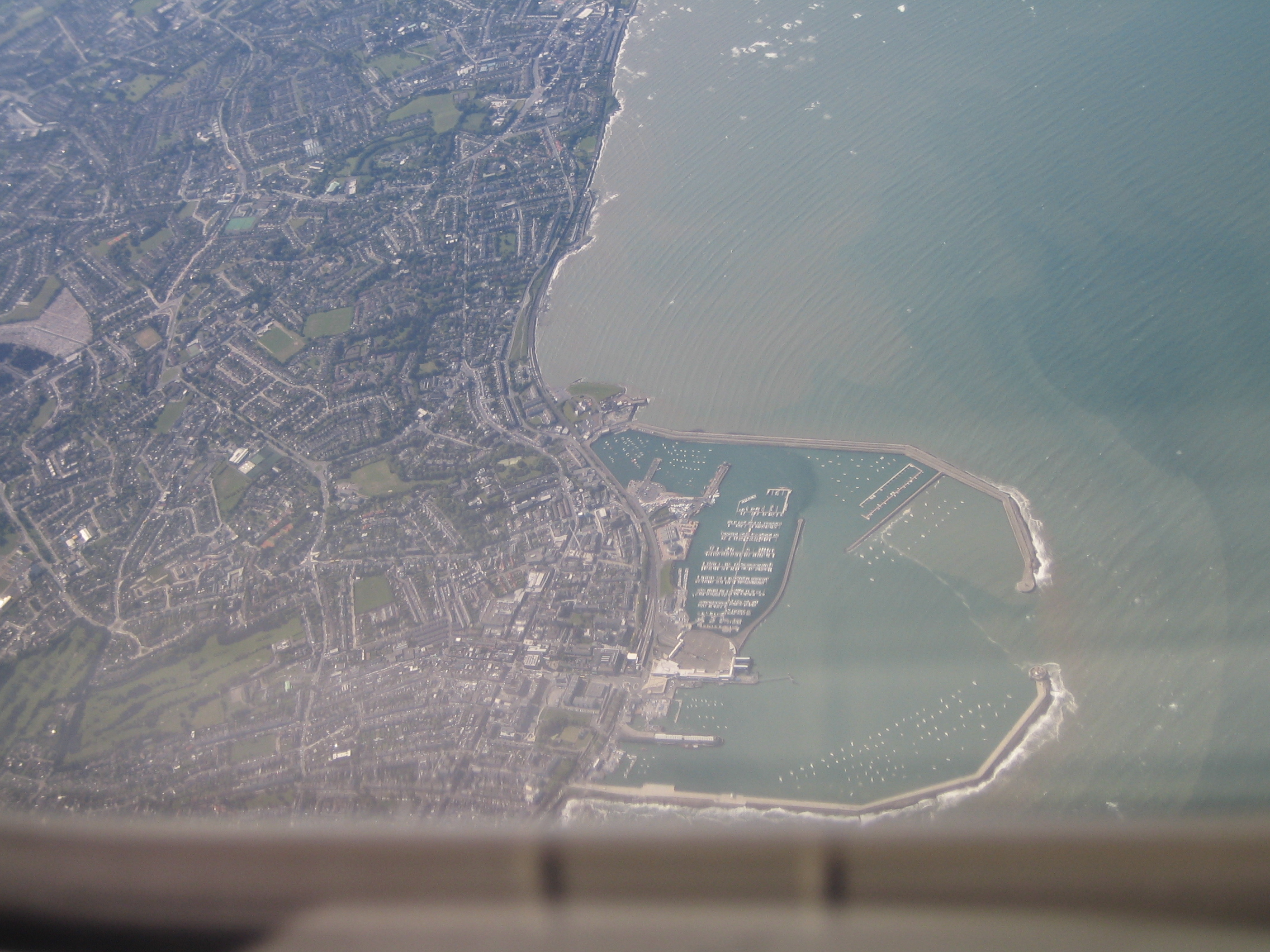
- Harbour from the air in 2009 looking West
- Interactive map of Dún Laoghaire Harbour

Location
- Country: Ireland
- Location: Dún Laoghaire
- Coordinates: 53.295062°N 6.130345°W

Details
- No. of berths: 5

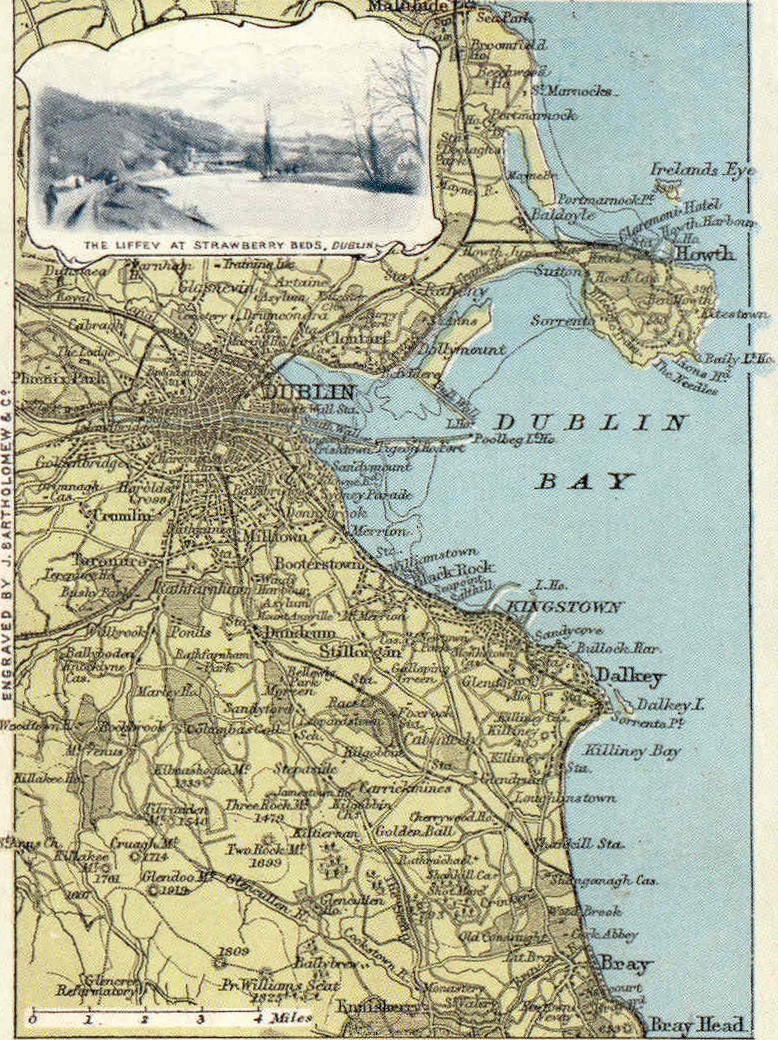
19th century map of Dublin Bay locating Kingstown Harbour

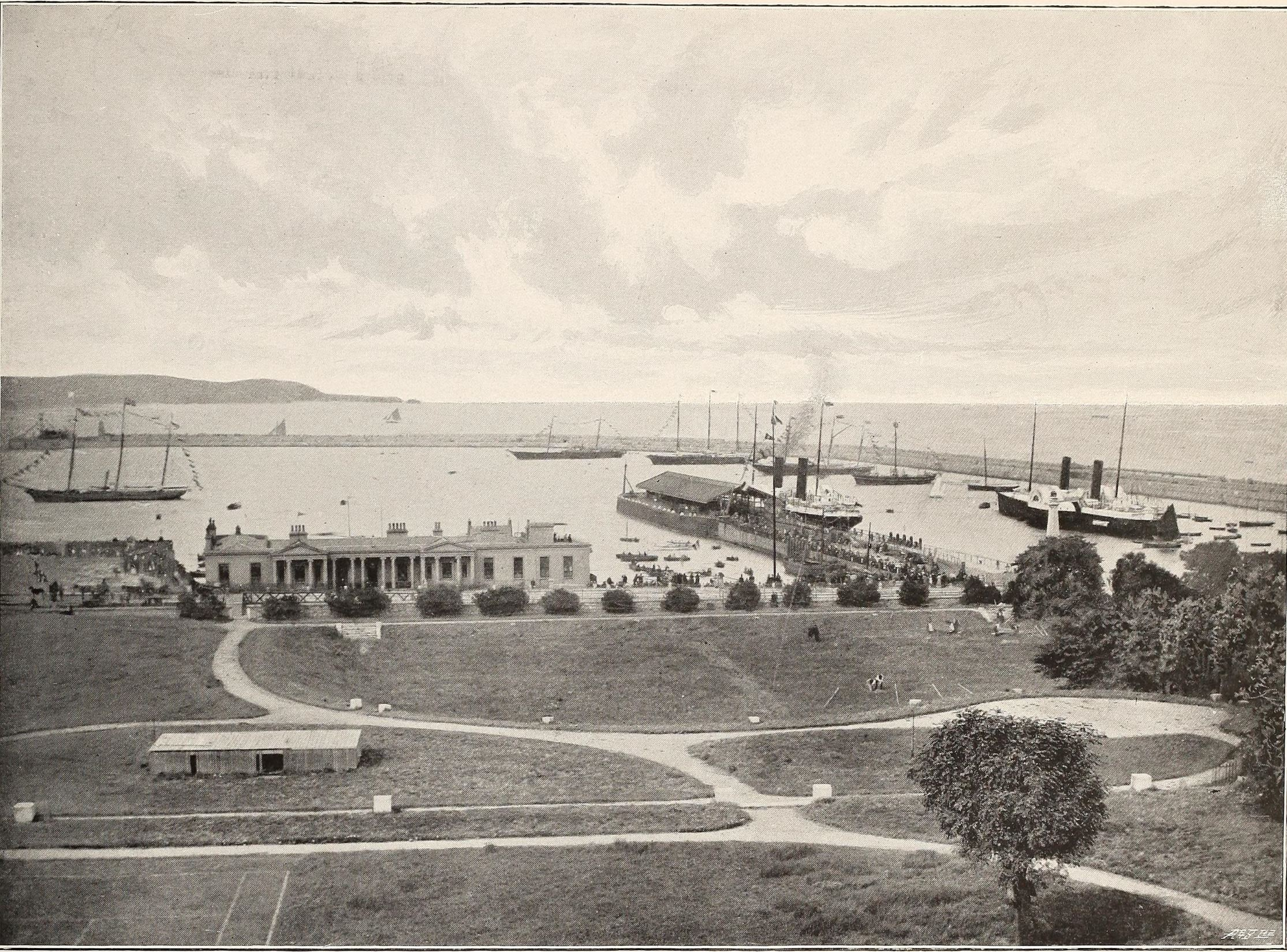
Carlisle Pier and Kingstown Harbour East late Victorian Era

Dún Laoghaire Harbour and Carlisle Pier were constructed in the nineteenth century for the purposes of sheltering ships and accommodating the mailboat which sailed between Dún Laoghaire and Holyhead. The nearby settlement of Dún Laoghaire has also previously been known as Kingstown and also as Dun Leary. Carlisle Pier has been known previously as Kingston Pier and the Mailboat Pier.

== Description ==
The piers of the harbour differ in length, with the west pier approximately 1.55 kilometres (0.96 mi) long, and the east pier approximately 1.3 kilometres (0.81 mi) long. They enclose an area of 250 acres (1.0 km^{2}) with the harbour entrance being 232 metres (761 ft) across. The glacis on the outer faces of the piers were designed to have a slope of 1 in 5 except for the lowest part increasing to 1 in 1 or 1 in two. The top of the pier had a width approaching two roadways, and this led to the width at the bottom of the seafloor being up to 80 metres (260 ft).

The harbour is divided into four major inner harbours by various piers and breakwaters. In the south west corner the Old Harbour (sometimes termed the inner Coal Harbour) is enclosed by the Old Pier constructed in 1767. The Old Harbour incorporates tidal public slipway. The exit from the Old Harbour leads to the Coal Harbour, bounded by the Traders Wharf which possesses a non-tidal public slipway. The Coal Harbour leads past the Marina Harbour which was created around 2001 together with the Western Breakwater and Eastern Breakwater to protect smaller boats. The Main Harbour covers the sweep from the Northern and Eastern breakwaters which mark a broadly North north east direction road past the harbour entrance and including all of the eastern part of the Harbour including St. Michael's Pier and Carlisle Pier and the five ship berths.

Since 3 October 2018 the management and operation of the harbour has transferred to Dún Laoghaire–Rathdown County Council from the Dún Laoghaire Harbour Company. Almost 200 years of a Holyhead to Dún Laoghaire passenger ferry service ended in 2014 when Stena consolidated all its services on Dublin Port. The port does accommodate passenger cruise ships although larger vessels are required to moor outside of the harbour and be serviced by tender.

== History ==
=== Harbour ===
A natural cove or creek was developed into what had now become known as the Old Harbour. In the eighteenth century Dún Laoghaire was a small village, previously termed Dunlary or Dunleary, supporting a small fishing community. Problems with silting and shifting sand bars in Dublin Bay meant some ships took to transferring passengers tender to the cove when weather and tides prevented entry to Dublin. Eventually following a parliamentary petition Charles Vallancey oversaw construction of a pier in 1767. While initially successful if soon became victim to silting and became known for a while as the "Dry Pier".

William Bligh mapped and charted Dublin Bay at the start of the nineteenth century and proposed a refuge harbour be built at Dún Laoghaire.

The problem of frequent shipwrecks from easterly gales with nowhere for shelter around Dublin Bay came to a head in 1807 with the loss of Rochdale and Prince of Wales. Searches for an asylum harbour for ships in rough weather found Dún Laoghaire to be a suitable location for the construction of such a harbour with a suitable depth of water close to the shore. The efforts of Richard Toutcher in advocating the harbour and securing the stone quarrying facilities at Dalkey were particularly noted. Construction of the East Pier to a design by John Rennie began in 1817 with Earl Whitworth Lord Lieutenant of Ireland laying the first stone.

Rennie had concerns a single pier would be subject to silting, and by 1820 gained support for construction of the Western pier to begin shortly afterward.

When King George IV left Ireland from the harbour in 1820, Dunleary was renamed Kingstown, a name that was to remain in use for nearly 100 years. The harbour was named the Royal Harbour of George the Fourth which seems not to have remained for so long.

1824 saw over 3,000 boats shelter in the partially completed harbour, but it also saw the beginning of operations off the North Wall which alleviated many of the issues ships were having accessing Dublin Port.

In 1826 Kingstown harbour gained the important mail packet service which at the time was under the stewardship of the Admiralty with a wharf completed on the East Pier in the following year. The service was transferred from Howth whose harbour had suffered from silting and the need for frequent dredging.

December 1834 saw the Dublin and Kingstown Railway begin operations from their terminus at Westland Row to a terminus at the West Pier which began at the old harbour.

1837 saw the creation of Victoria Wharf, since renamed St. Michael's Wharf with the D&KR extended and a new terminus created convenient to the wharf. The extended line had cut a chord across the old harbour with the landward pool so created later filled in.

By 1842 the largest man-made harbour in Western Europe had been completed with the construction of the East Pier lighthouse after some disagreements were resolved on how to complete the harbour opening.

The harbour was further enhanced by completion of Traders Wharf in 1855 and Carlisle Pier in 1856. The mid-1850s also saw the completion of the West Pier lighthouse. The railway was connected to Bray in 1856.

Kingstown reverted to the name Dún Laoghaire in 1920 and in 1924 the harbour was officially renamed "Dun Laoghaire Harbour".

=== Carlisle Pier ===
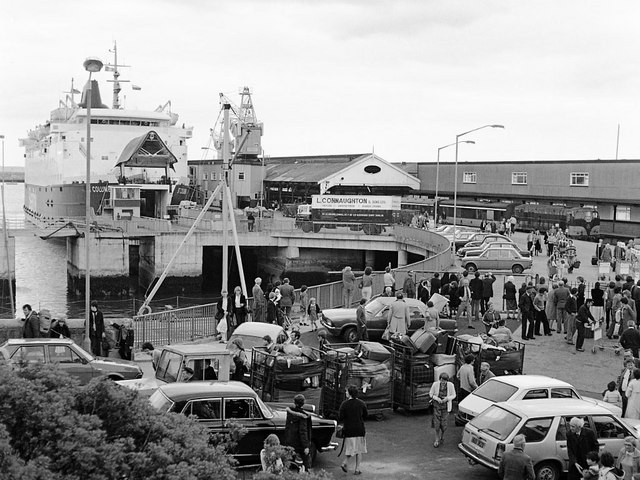
Carlisle Pier July 1980, the last year of the trains with the Pier now modified for a Car Ferry

Construction of the pier started in 1853 and was completed in 1855. The railway station opened in 1859. The pier was named after the Earl of Carlisle, then Lord Lieutenant of Ireland. In subsequent years many Irish people emigrated from it.

The RMS Leinster departed from the pier on her final voyage in October 1918, when she was torpedoed and sunk by a German U-boat.

In 1953 a passenger lounge was built along the east side of the pier and around the end with sheds added in the 1960s.

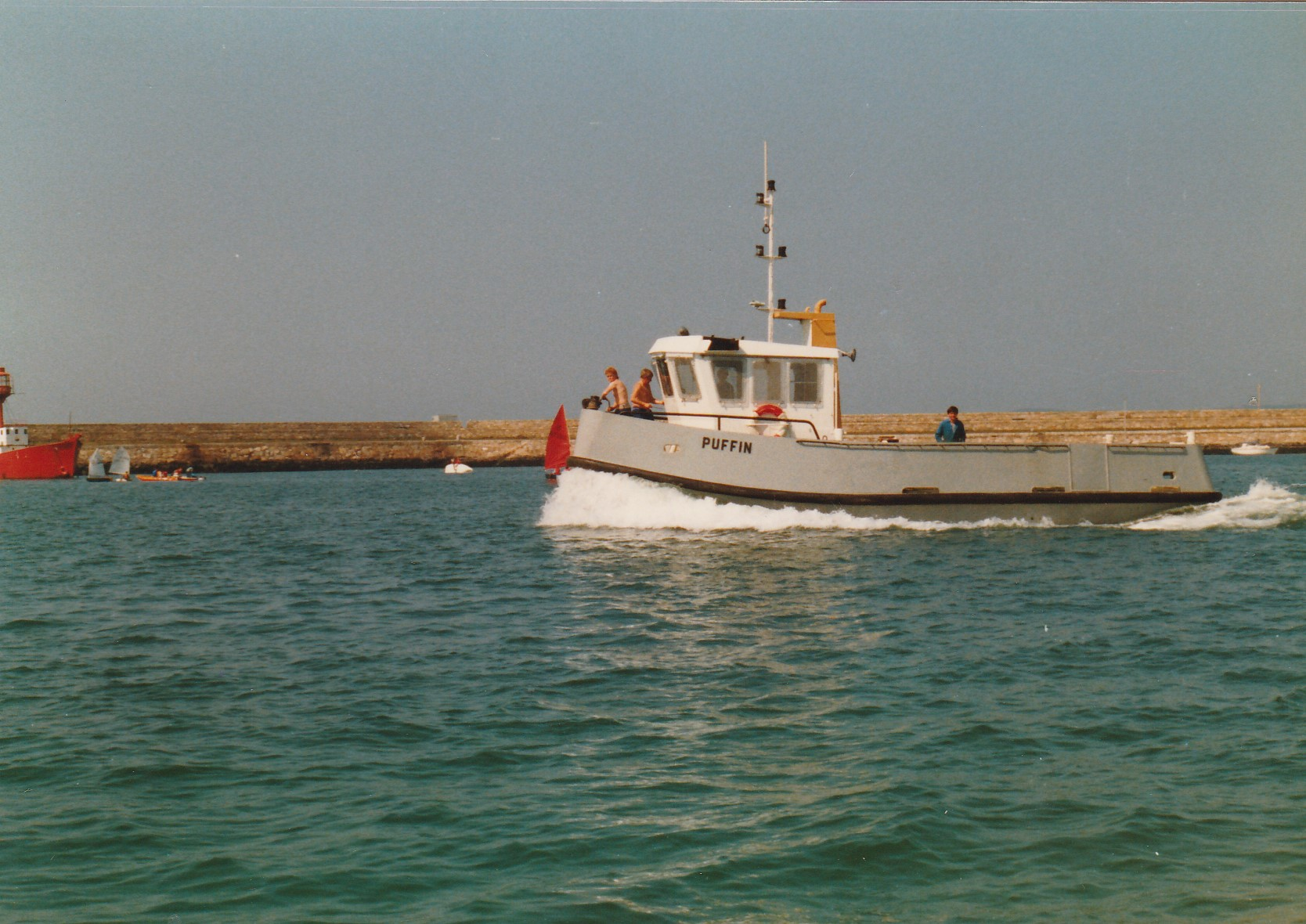
The harbour in 1987

In 2009 Dún Laoghaire Harbour Company began demolishing the 1960s structures, preserving the cast-iron columns of the original 1850s structure. The harbour company had been accused of planning to demolish the pier itself by Richard Boyd Barrett, an accusation the company rejected. There had been a number of buildings proposed to be built on the pier over the years, but all have fallen through. The demolition was criticised though some politicians supported it. The building infrastructure is now removed and pier is currently used as a car park, boat storage, unloading of unusual cargoes and special events such as funfairs.

==== Railway Station ====
The railway station on the pier opened in 1859. It provided a link for both passengers and postal traffic between the main railways and the ferry service. Originally trains could only go to Westland Row (Pearse station, but with the opening of the loop line in 1891 enabled services to Broadstone and Kingsbridge Heuston). Closure came on 11 October 1980 due to the curvature of the platform being an issue for modern stock and the expense that would have been incurred resolving a connection with the main line that had been lowered to accommodate overhead electrification for the DART.

| Preceding station | Disused railways | Following station |
|---|---|---|
| Dun Laoghaire; Line and station open | Great Southern Railways; Dun Laoghaire boat train | Terminus |

=== St. Michael's Pier ===
The port's first car ferry service operated on 9 July 1965 by the Normannia using a temporary terminal on the East Pier. The 175 metres (574 ft) purpose-built with a capacity of 650 cars per day twin berth St. Michael's Pier opened on 9 March 1969 by Holyhead Ferry I.

== Service users ==
The harbour serves a variety of types of user but has tended to more leisure use in recent times. Activities include promenade walks along the east and west piers. Water-based include rowing, canoeing and yachting with a marina and local clubs. There is a commercial small boat cruise service across Dublin Bay and private charter fishing trips. While Dún Laoghaire used to have a significant fishing fleet this was lost when Howth became designated a Fishery Harbout Centre. The harbour has support an RNLI lifeboat station with both inshore and all weather lifeboats. The harbour is also the base for the Commissioners of Irish Lights and National Maritime Museum of Ireland. In 2017 the harbour conferred freedom of entry to the Irish Naval service, the LÉ Eithne being particularly associated with the harbour. The long history of passenger services to the port finished in 2015 but there has been some intermittent visits by cruise ships.

== See also ==
- Dún Laoghaire Harbour Police

== Sources ==
- Pearson, Peter (1981). Dun Laoghaire Kingstown. Dublin: O'Brien Press. ISBN 0-905140-83-4. OL 22450451M.
