= Airport Police Dog Unit =

The Airport Police Dog Unit (APDU) (Irish: Aonad Gadhar Póilíní an t-Aerfoirt) is a unit of the Airport Police Service, which is a small police force in Ireland. The unit has been in existence since the early 1970s, and plays an integral part in the security and policing of Dublin Airport.

The primary function of the Dog Unit is to patrol Dublin Airport’s 17 kilometre boundary. Using its own fit-for-purpose vehicles, the officers check the integrity of the fencing and investigate possible breaches 24 hours a day, every day of the year.

They also provide assistance to their colleagues in the Airport Police Service with public order situations and searches for persons.

This Police unit have statutory exemptions under the Control of Dogs Regulations 1998
