= Dún Laoghaire Harbour Police =

Coordinates: 53.294440°N 6.135588°W

Dún Laoghaire Harbour Police Póilíní Cuain Dún Laoghaire

Agency overview
- Formed: 1924
- Preceding agency: Kingstown Harbour Police (1836)

Jurisdictional structure
- Operations jurisdiction: Ireland

Website
- dlharbour.ie

The Dún Laoghaire Harbour Police is a small, specialised police force in Dún Laoghaire, County Dublin, Ireland that provides police services in Dún Laoghaire Harbour, and operates under the jurisdiction of the Dún Laoghaire–Rathdown County Council.

The force was established in 1836 as the Kingstown Harbour Police under the provisions of the Kingstown Harbour Act 1836. The current name was taken in 1924. The force has the power of arrest under section 54 of the Harbours Act 1996 to arrest persons in connection with offences under the Act, although they are then required to hand them over to the Garda Síochána. Prior to the passage of the Act, the Harbour Police were under the employ of the Department for the Marine and were sworn as constables under the Harbours, Docks and Piers Clauses Act 1847.

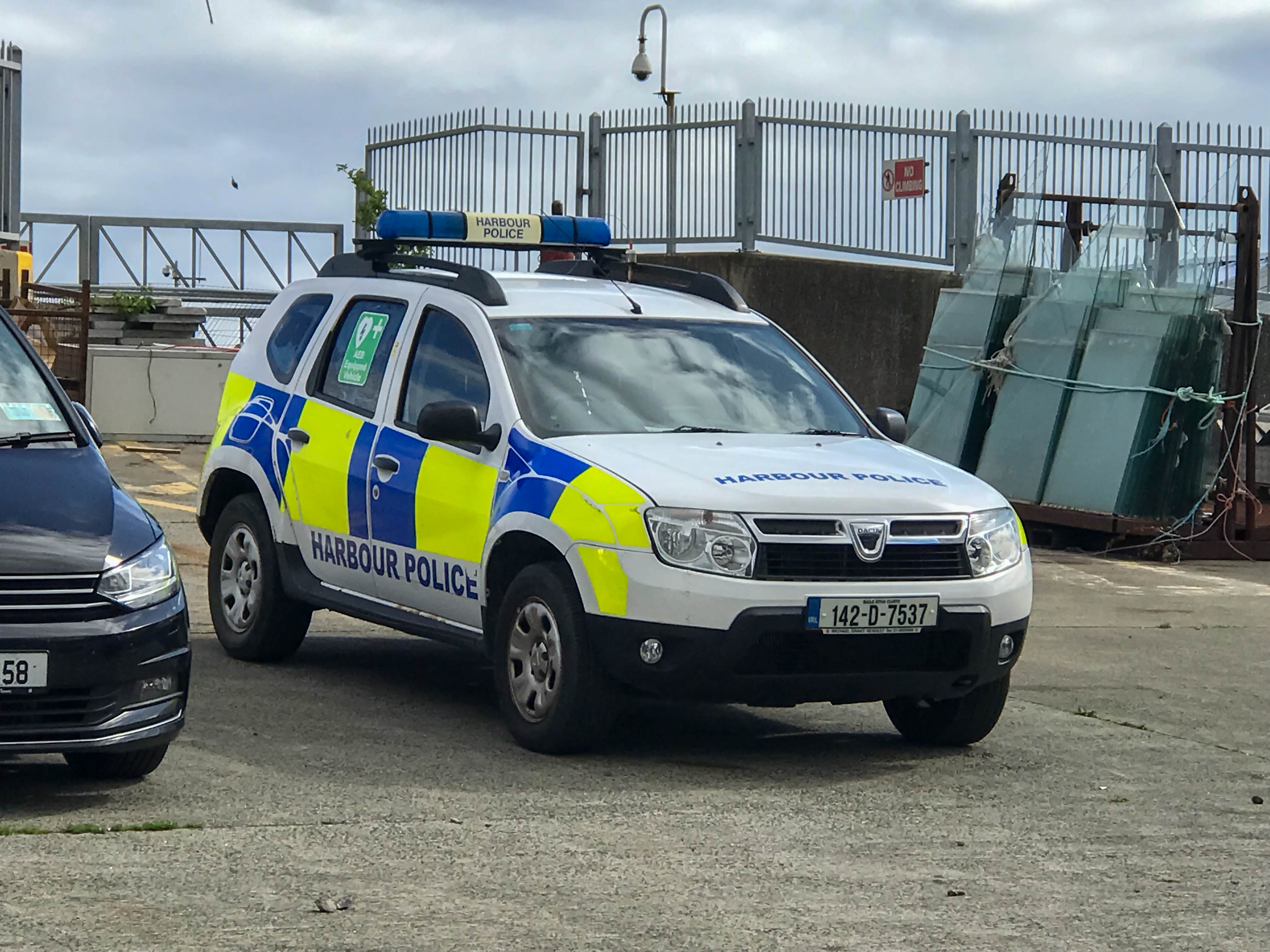
Dacia Duster of the Dún Laoghaire Harbour Police

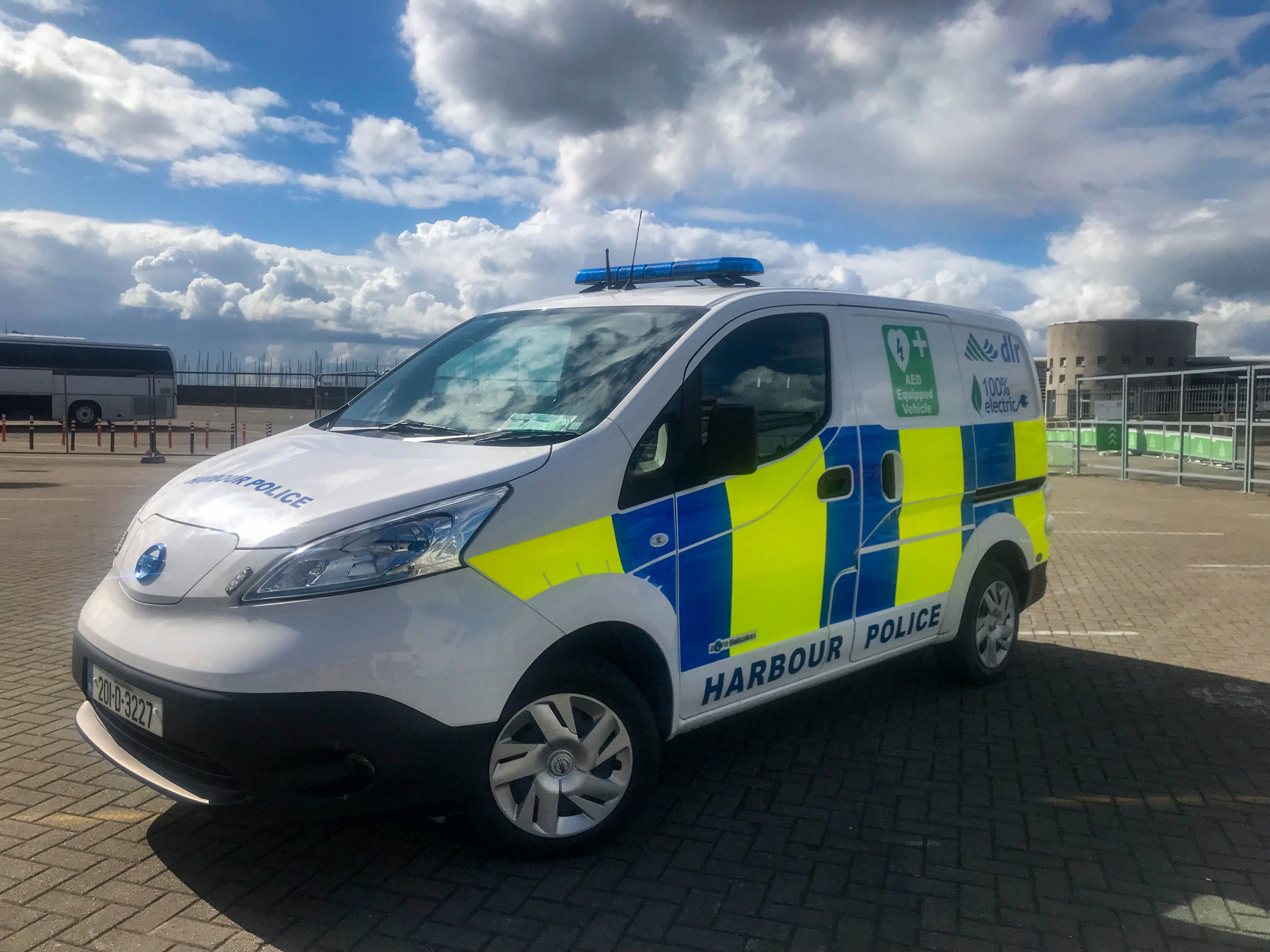
Nissan e-NV200 of the Dún Laoghaire Harbour Police

== See also ==
- Dublin Harbour Police
