= Airport Police Service =

Law enforcement agency in Ireland

Airport Police Service Póilíní an Aerfoirt
- Logos of the Dublin, Shannon and Cork Airport Police forces.
- Abbreviation: APS

Agency overview
- Formed: 1936
- Employees: 300 plus civilian support

Jurisdictional structure
- Operations jurisdiction: Ireland
- Population: 1–22.7 million passengers per year and airport staff over three airports
- Legal jurisdiction: Land and property belonging to Minister for Transport
- Governing body: Department of Transport
- Constituting instruments: Air Navigation & Transport Acts 1936–1998; State Airport Act 2004; Airport Byelaws 1994

Operational structure
- Headquarters: Dublin Airport, Ireland
- Parent agency: daa plc

Facilities
- Stations: 4

Website
- www.daa.ie

The Airport Police Service (APS) (Irish: Póilíní an Aerfoirt) is a small private police force responsible for providing general security and aviation security duties at the three state airports in Ireland: Dublin Airport, Cork Airport Shannon Airport and Ireland West Airport Knock. The Airport Police Service was first founded in 1936 in Dublin Airport and first became "Authorised Officers" under section 15 of the Air Navigation and Transport Act 1950 for the Minister of Transport.

== Organisation & role ==
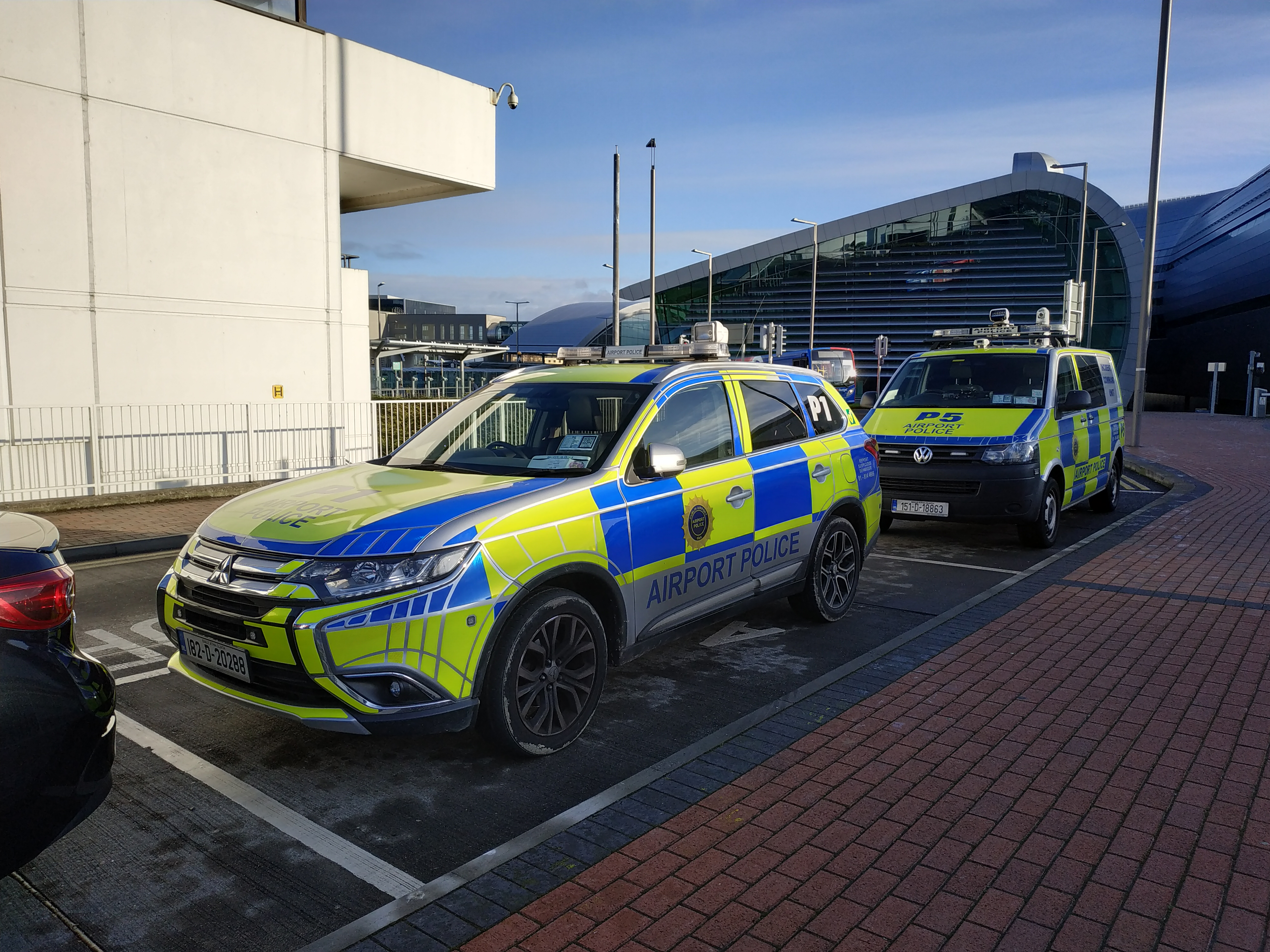
Airport police vehicles in front of the Dublin Airport

The APS is established, funded and maintained by the owners of Dublin Airport and Cork Airport, DAA (previously known as Dublin Airport Authority) and in Shannon Airport by the Shannon Airport Authority, both entities are owned by the Irish Government.

The role and objectives of the Airport Police Service is the prevention, detection and response to all minor criminal acts occurring within their jurisdictional area along with ensuring public safety and the maintenance of public order. The force is also mandated to safeguard the airport from acts of unlawful interference to civil aviation.

The Airport Police Service play an integral role as a secondary responding agency (RA) in the event of any major emergency or incident occurring in the airport and work alongside the Airport Fire & Rescue Service or agencies such as Gardaí, HSE or Dublin Fire Brigade & Ambulance Service / local fire service.

Each of the state airport authorities are "statutory undertakers" under section 23 of the Air Navigation and Transport (Amendment) Act 1998. The companies meets statutory requirements under the act by having its own police service while also meeting other requirements under other national and international aviation regulations and legislation which are required to be met for the state airports to operate.

At the state airports, each force is led by a chief police officer who is responsible for the oversight and management of the police service. The chief officer is supported by a group of senior officers and a team of support staff.

Officers of the service have some powers of detention and intervention authorised by the Minister for Transport / Airport Authority under section 48 of the Act of 1998 and other powers granted through other acts, police officers of the APS after selection and successful completion of recruit training are appointed and empowered as authorised officers and issued with an ID card, these powers may be used within the limits and premises of each of the Irish state airports, and elsewhere on lands and roadways belonging to the Minister of Transport.

== General powers and status of officers ==
Members of the Airport Police Service have the powers to:

- Stop and search (this includes persons, their property, vehicles, aircraft and cargo in an airport).
- Demand a person's name and address, evidence of one's identity and other relevant information.
- Detain persons (for such time as is reasonably necessary for the exercise of any of his/her powers under Section 33 Air Navigations & Transport Act 1988)
- Remove and issue persons banning orders (these are usually issued in cases of anti-social behaviour) to temporarily prohibit a person's re-entry to the airport.
- Arrest a person on the minister's land—this includes passenger terminals, cargo areas, car parks, on board aircraft, runways, radar sites or on any air navigation installation—this also includes any other roadways, land or property owned, leased or operated by the Dublin Airport Authority or Minister for Transport, even if it is located outside of an airport's security perimeter fence, for the purpose of handing such persons over to Gardai for investigation and prosecution.
- Other powers of enforcement conferred upon them, such as those detailed within the airport byelaws.

Members of the APS are defined as "competent persons" employed by a public authority under Section 18 of Criminal Justice Act 2006 for the purpose of taking and receiving witness statements in the course of their duties.

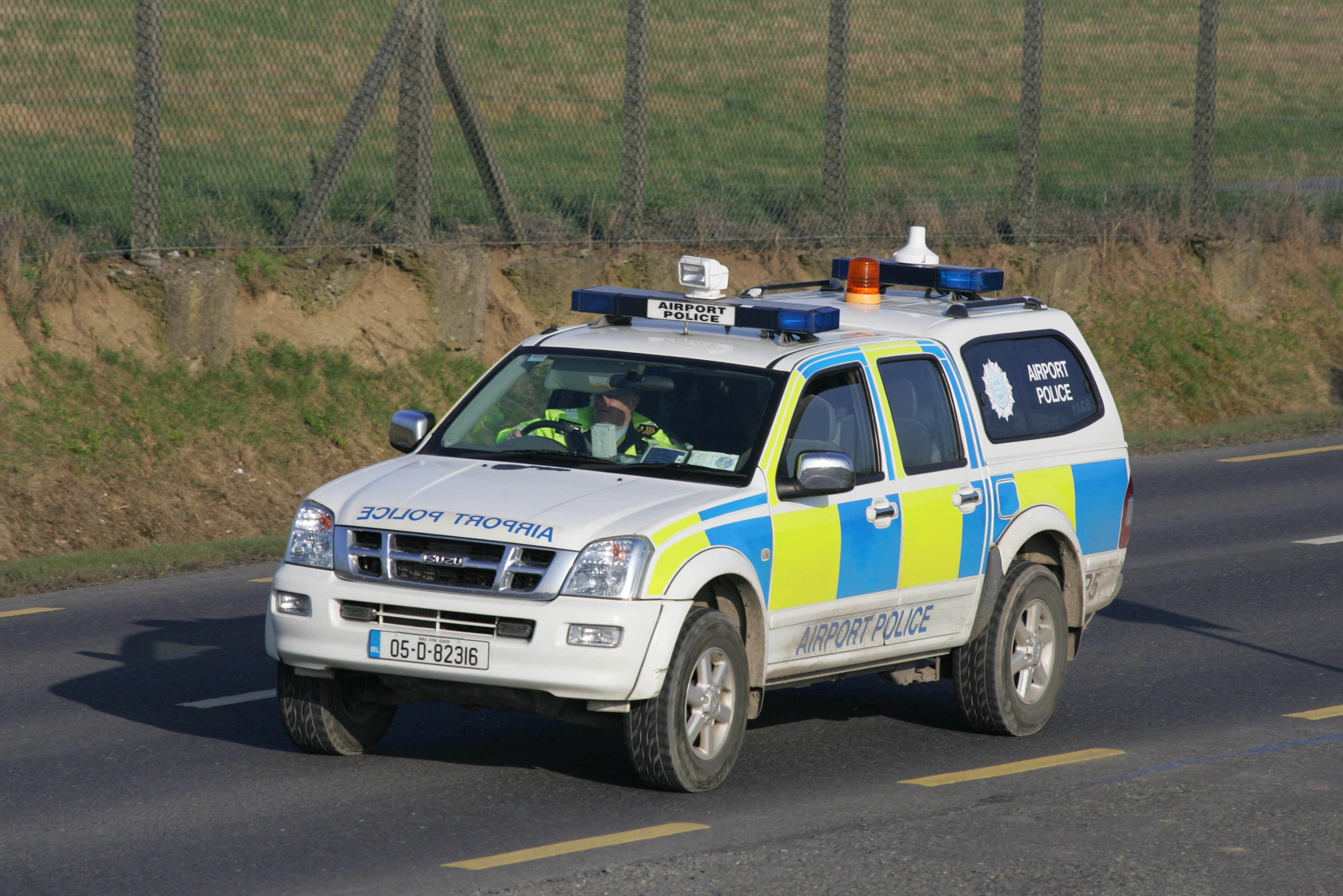
A Dublin Airport Police Isuzu

Under Section 33 of the Air Navigation and Transport Act 1988 (as amended by the Air Navigation and Transport Act 1998), they can arrest persons in connection with offences under that act or certain other legislation provided such persons are handed over to Gardai as soon as possible. It is an offence to obstruct, impede, assault or impersonate an authorised officer (Each warranted member of the police service is classed as an authorised officer under law.)

Each year, officers of the force effect several hundred arrests for a wide variety of offences, including assault, theft, fraud and breach of the public order. Members of the Airport Police are required to transfer custody of their prisoners over to the Garda Síochána for investigation and if warranted, to be prosecuted by the Director of Public Prosecutions.

Offences committed under the Airports byelaws detected by the Airport Police can be dealt with by way of reporting for summons to the district court to initiate a prosecution on behalf of the Airport Authority, or by the issue of a fixed penalty notice.

== Agency relationships ==
A memorandum of understanding (MOU) between the APS and the Garda Síochána, Office of the Revenue Commissioners and other agencies such as AAIU or the Taxi Regulator sets out each organisation's responsibilities and inter-agency co-operation. The Airport Police have a long-standing and positive relationship with these other agencies. Mutual support and assistance is common.

The APS also work closely with the aviation security section within the Department of Transport to identify and respond to emerging threats to civil aviation in Ireland.

The APS can undertake initial response to all criminal offences under the Airports and Aviation Acts 1936 to 2004, airport byelaws and other legislation within the airport. Any criminal offences however must be reported to Gardai as the airport police have no powers of investigation. However, APS officers will take immediate necessary action prior to the arrival of the Garda Síochána in some cases. Armed detectives from the Garda National Immigration Bureau (GNIB) are stationed at a number of airports in Ireland, and armed officers from the Garda Emergency Response Unit (ERU) and regional Garda Armed Support Units (ASU) sometimes patrol airports, particularly during heightened states of alert.

== Ranks ==
- Police officer (oifigeach póilíní) / police dog handler (APDU; láimhseálaí maidre)
- Sergeant (sairsint)
- Inspector (cigire)
- Chief airport police officer (CAPO)

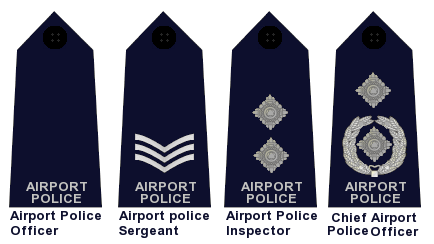
Apfs rank markingsg1

== Staffing and structure ==
At Dublin Airport, the Police Service now operates as a separate service to the Airport Fire & Rescue Service recruiting officers directly into either service. Recruitment into the force is currently conducted internally. To be eligible to apply a person must be employed by the Airport Authority, be over the age of 18 and meet a number of recruitment criteria similar to those that are required of entrants to the Gardaí or Dublin Fire Brigade.

A number of officers still rotate duties between both services on a shift by shift or operational requirements basis. In both Cork Airport and Shannon Airport the police/fire service is still combined. There are over 300 members of all services between the three airports.

=== Support units ===
Although the majority of officers perform uniformed and plain clothes patrol duties, the force also includes a number of varied police operational support units such as:

- Airport Police Dog Unit
- Investigation Support Section
- Training Unit
- Access Identification Control Unit

== Uniform, equipment, facilities and vehicles ==
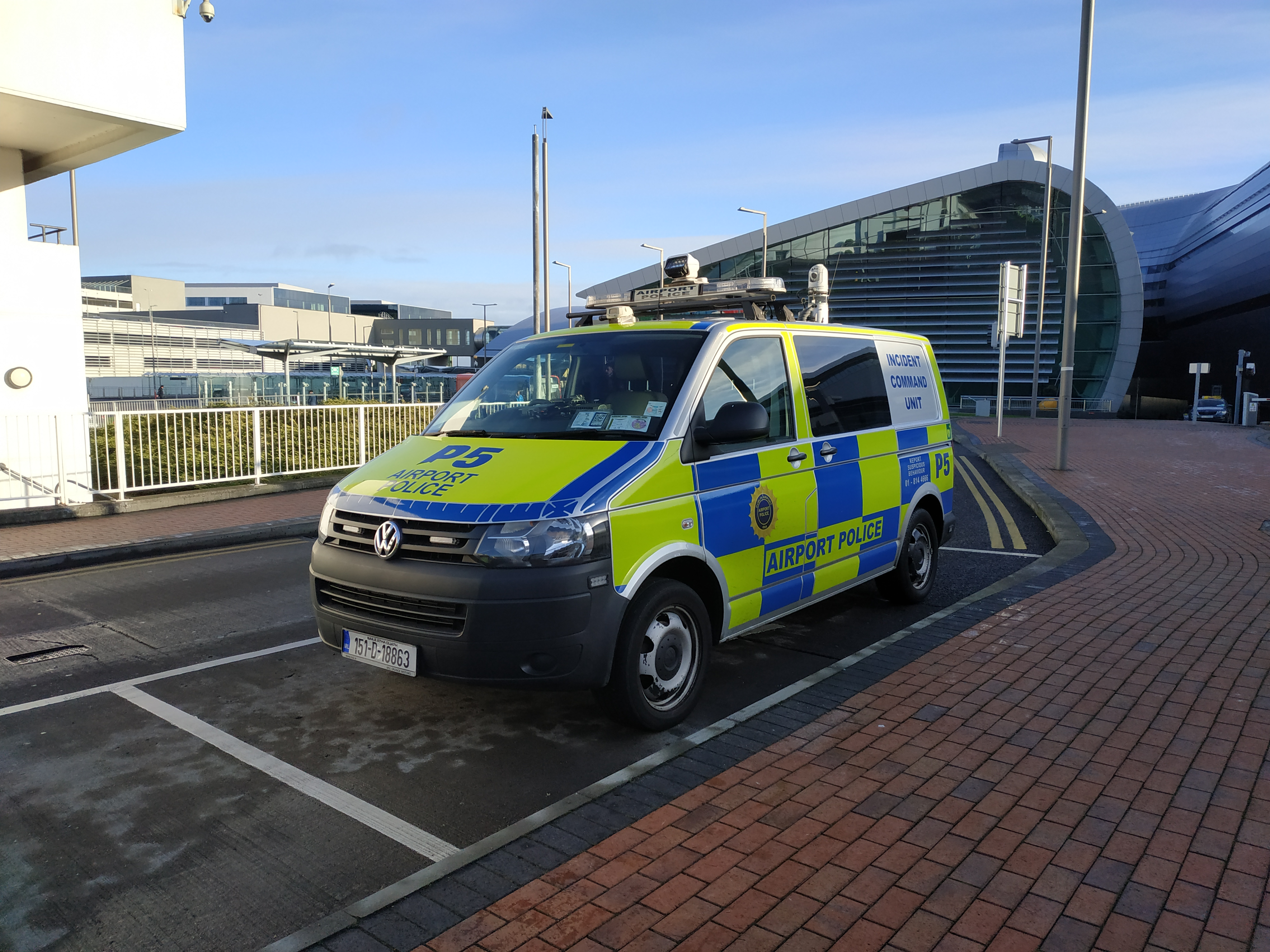
Volkswagen T5 on duty in 2019

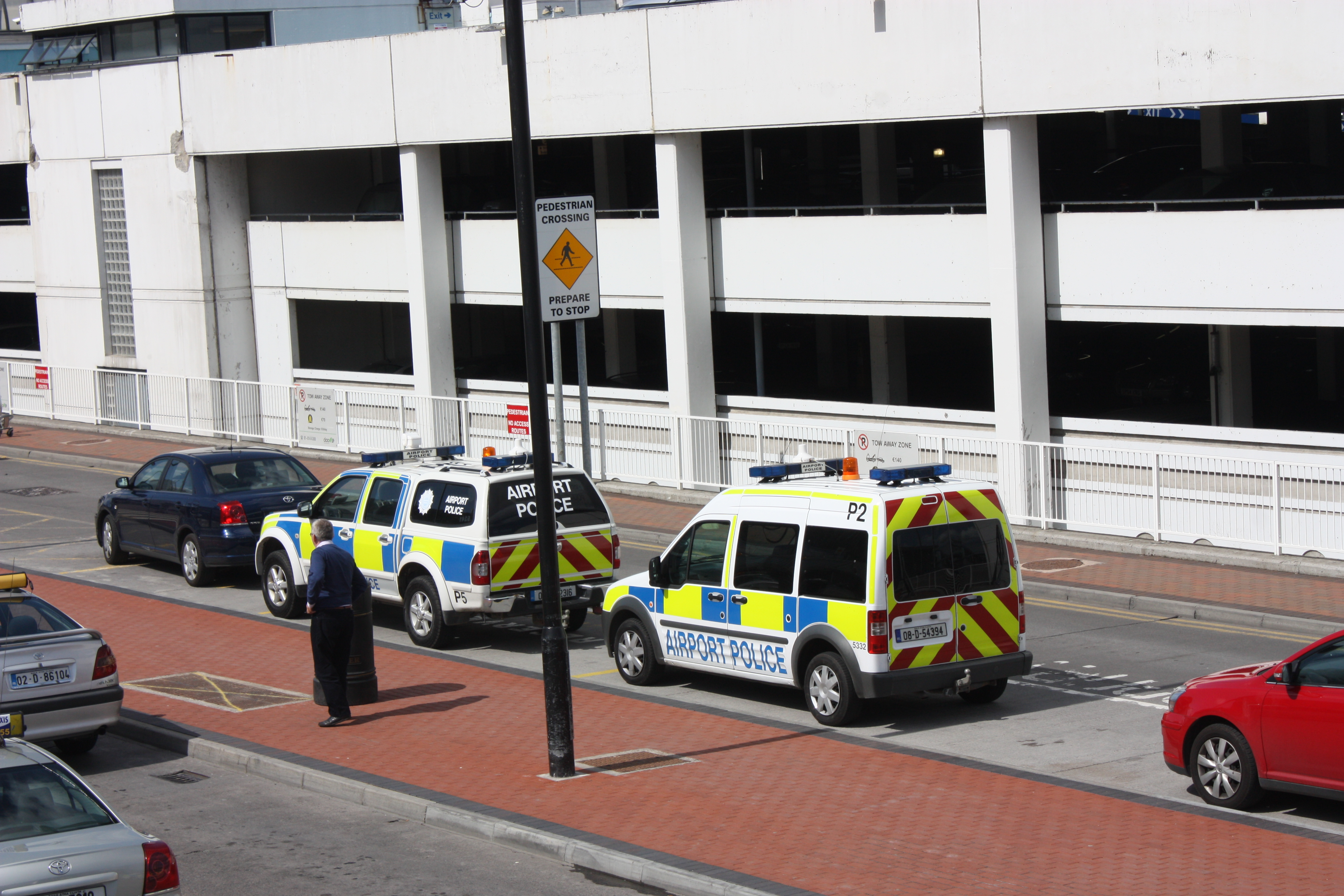
Airport Police vehicles

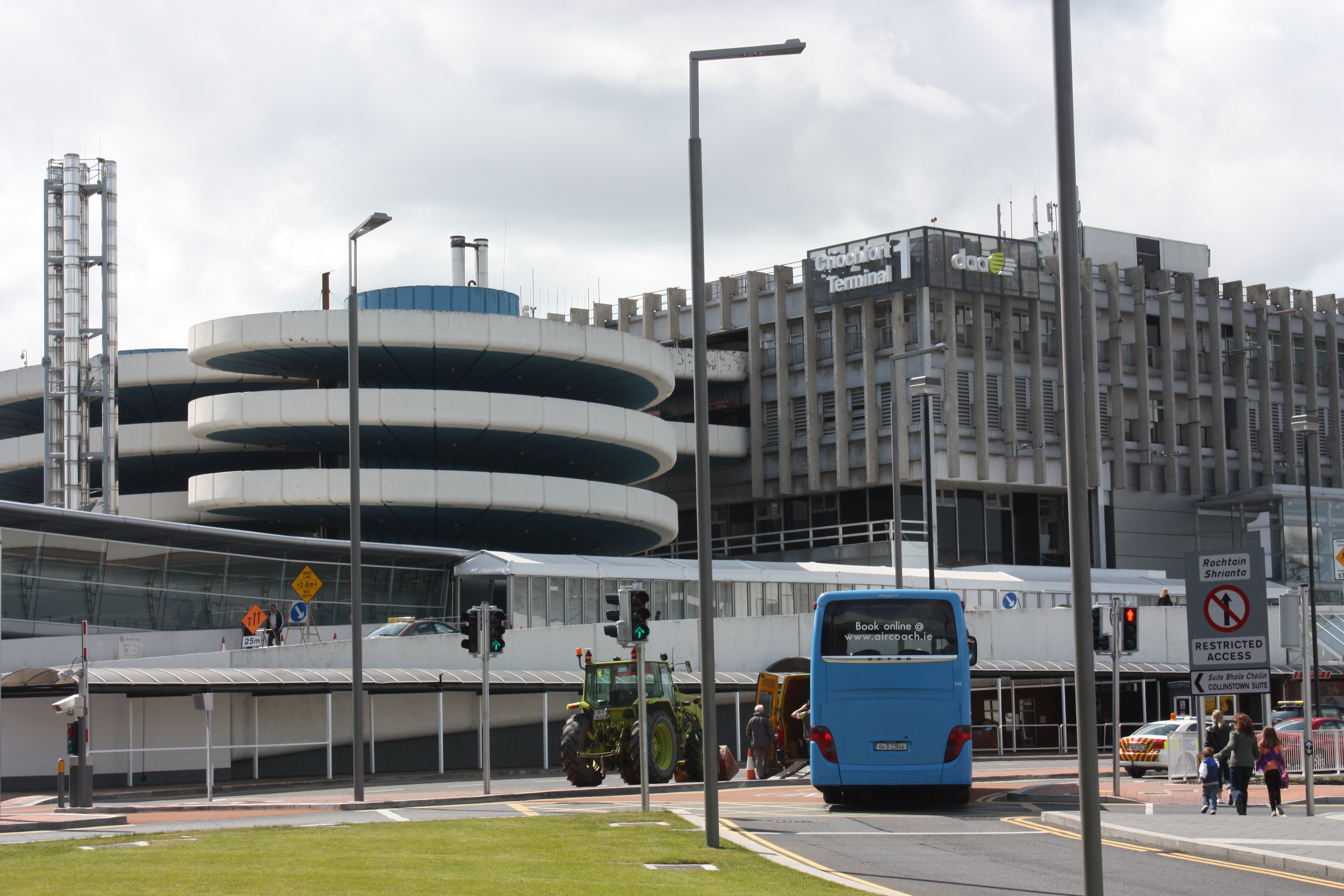
The Airport Police Station is located on the arrivals road of Terminal 1.

=== Headgear ===
Officers wear a navy peaked cap with the force's cap badge attached when on mobile patrol.

Officers holding the rank of inspector or above also wear peaked caps but with slight differences to denote their senior role.

=== Uniform ===
When on duty officers wear a dark navy, wicking T-shirt with the words 'Airport Police' on the sleeves, along with dark navy tactical trousers and a pair of Gore-Tex boots. Airport officers no longer use the traditional police jumper, having favoured a black fleece with 'Airport Police' written on the chest and back and the same sequence on the issue high-visibility patrol blouson jacket.

Formal dress comprises a dark navy open-necked tunic and uniform trousers, with a blue shirt/blouse and tie. The No.1 uniform is accompanied by black boots or shoes.

For ceremonial events such as passing out parades, guards of honour or on funerals duties, a white staple-belt, gloves and shoulder lanyard are worn.

=== Personal equipment ===
Members of the APS are required to wear a stab vest whilst on patrol. Currently, officers also wear a high visibility yellow tactical vests. In addition, officers carry Motorola digital radios, Hiatt rigid handcuffs, torch, notebook, resuscitation mask and a basic first aid kit.

=== Facilities ===
In Dublin Airport, the Airport Police Station is centrally located on the arrivals road of Terminal 1. The stations public office is open from 07:00 to 23:00 and deals with enquiries from members of the public and staff. All lost property that is found within the airport is also handed in and claimed at this location along, with matters relating to impounded vehicles or unattended baggage or other such offences in accordance with the airport byelaws. Incidents requiring the attention of the Airport Police can be reported there also.

The force also operates an emergency phone line for members of the public to contact them on, along with state-of-the-art police control rooms for the management and co-ordination of the airport's security operations and incident response.

=== Vehicles and livery ===
The Airport Police Service uses a selection of vehicles for their individual capabilities and the requirements of the roles for which they are employed these include:

- Mitsubishi Outlander – Response/Patrol Vehicle 4x4s
- Ford Transit Connect – General Purpose/Prisoner Transport Vehicle
- Škoda Octavia – Response/Patrol Vehicle
- Land Rover Discovery – Dog Unit 4x4s

The Airport Police Service currently use the standard yellow and blue retro-reflective Battenberg markings, together with the force crest, on all marked, operational vehicles. the force also utilize

- Unmarked police vehicles
- EOD/IED mobile bomb containment systems
- Incident control unit

All police drivers undergo a standard response driving course. Officers may activate the emergency blue lighting and sirens when responding to an emergency while on duty.

Police vehicles may contain a variety of equipment, which can include traffic cones, road signs, defibrillators, traffic speed guns and the like.

Common battenburg markings used by Airport Police Fire Service
Airport Police Service	Yellow / Blue
Airport Fire Rescue Service	Yellow / Red

== Airport Fire Rescue Service ==
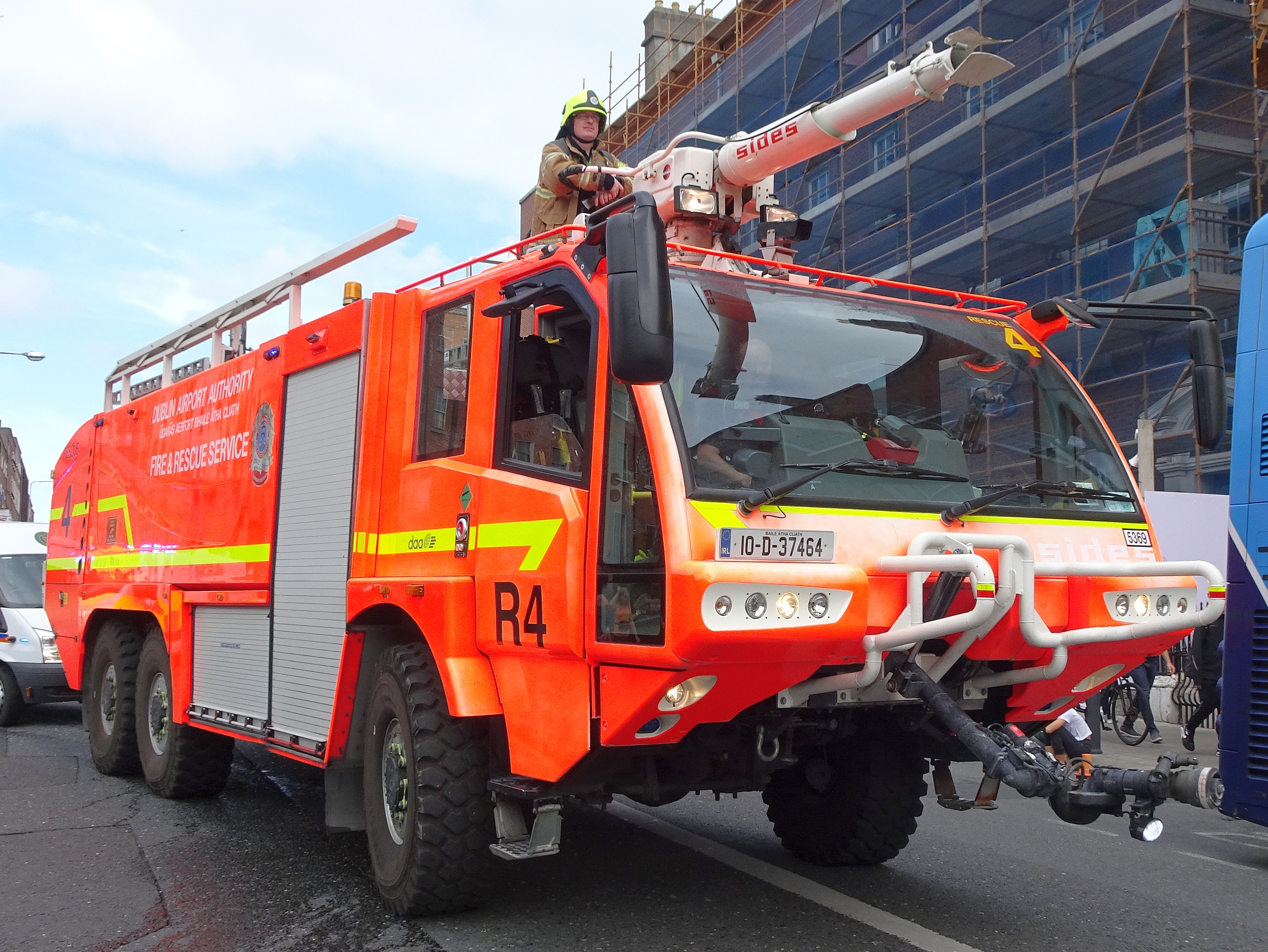
Dublin Airport Fire and Rescue Service

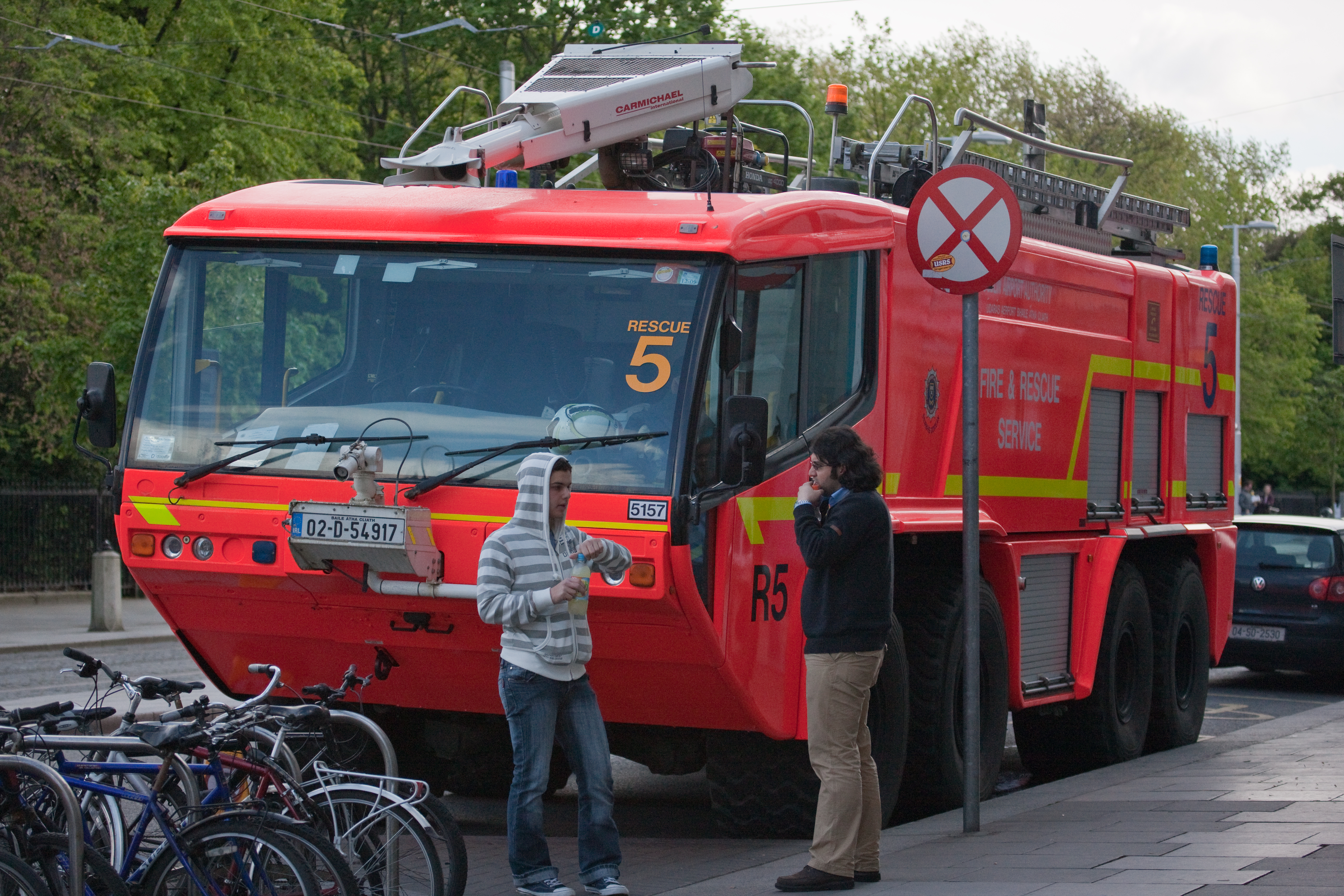
Dublin Airport Fire and Rescue Service

The Airport Fire & Rescue Service (Irish: Seirbhís Dóiteáin an Aerfoirt) (AFRS) operate from the fire station on Dublin Airport's westlands beside the ATC complex and from similar modern fire stations in both Cork & Shannon airports. Dublin Airport also have the largest non-military fire station in Europe. The services provides fire cover to both the entire airport campus, aircraft operations and to surrounding areas on request from their respective local authority fire service e.g. Dublin Fire Brigade.

An airport's fire & rescue service is led by its own chief fire officer, who has overall responsibility for the delivery of all its mandated roles and services. The AFRS incorporates its own separate rank structure to that of the police.

- Firefighter
- Station officer
- Aerodrome fire officer
- Chief fire officer

The AFRS is classed as a "Rescue Fire Fighting Service" and it is required and maintained by the DAA to satisfy and comply with Irish Aviation Authority licensing and regulatory requirements as per ICAO Annex 14 Airport Manual.

ICAO-Annex 14 requires the RFFS to be

- Professionally organised, adequately equipped, sufficiently staffed and effectively trained to operate the equipment, with a goal of saving lives.

In Dublin Airport the fire service also provide an emergency ambulance service, with paramedics trained to Pre-Hospital Emergency Care Council (PHECC) standard.

The service have a modern array of Crash Rescue Fire appliances along with its own Domestic Class-B Water Ladder Appliances, a HAZMAT unit and a Skylift/Aerial Platform alongside a modern aircraft fire simulation rig & their own ex-Ryanair Boeing 737 § 737-200 both of which are used for training purposes.

Due to the smaller size of Cork and Shannon airports, the Fire Service is staffed by a mix of police and firefighters rotating between roles. In Dublin, the services operate under the umbrella of the APFS, but operate independently to each other, except for a number of officers whom continue to rotate between both services.

== Airport Police Fire Service Band ==
The APFS brass band was formed in October 1995, and gave its first public performance on Dublin Airport in January 1996.

The band comprises serving members of both services and associate members. They provide music for official Airport functions (such as graduation ceremonies at the Airport Police and Airport Fire & Rescue Service) the band undertakes a community-oriented programme each year performing at schools, festivals and charity events.
