= Military Police Corps (Ireland) =

Military Police Corps in the Irish Defence Forces

Military Police Corps Cór Póiliní an Airm
- Military Police Beret

- Badge of the Irish Military Police Corps
- Abbreviation: MP / PA (Irish)
- Motto: Steadfast and Vigilant

Agency overview
- Formed: 1 October 1924 – present

Jurisdictional structure
- Operations jurisdiction: Ireland
- General nature: Military police; Civilian police

Operational structure
- Parent agency: Defence Forces
- Units: Unit: 4 companies; 1st Brigade Military Police Company - Cork; 2nd Brigade Military Police Company - Dublin; Defence Forces Training Centre Military Police Company - Kildare; Military Police Government Buildings Company - DFHQ/Dublin

Website
- www.military.ie/en/who-we-are/army/army-corps/military-police-corps/

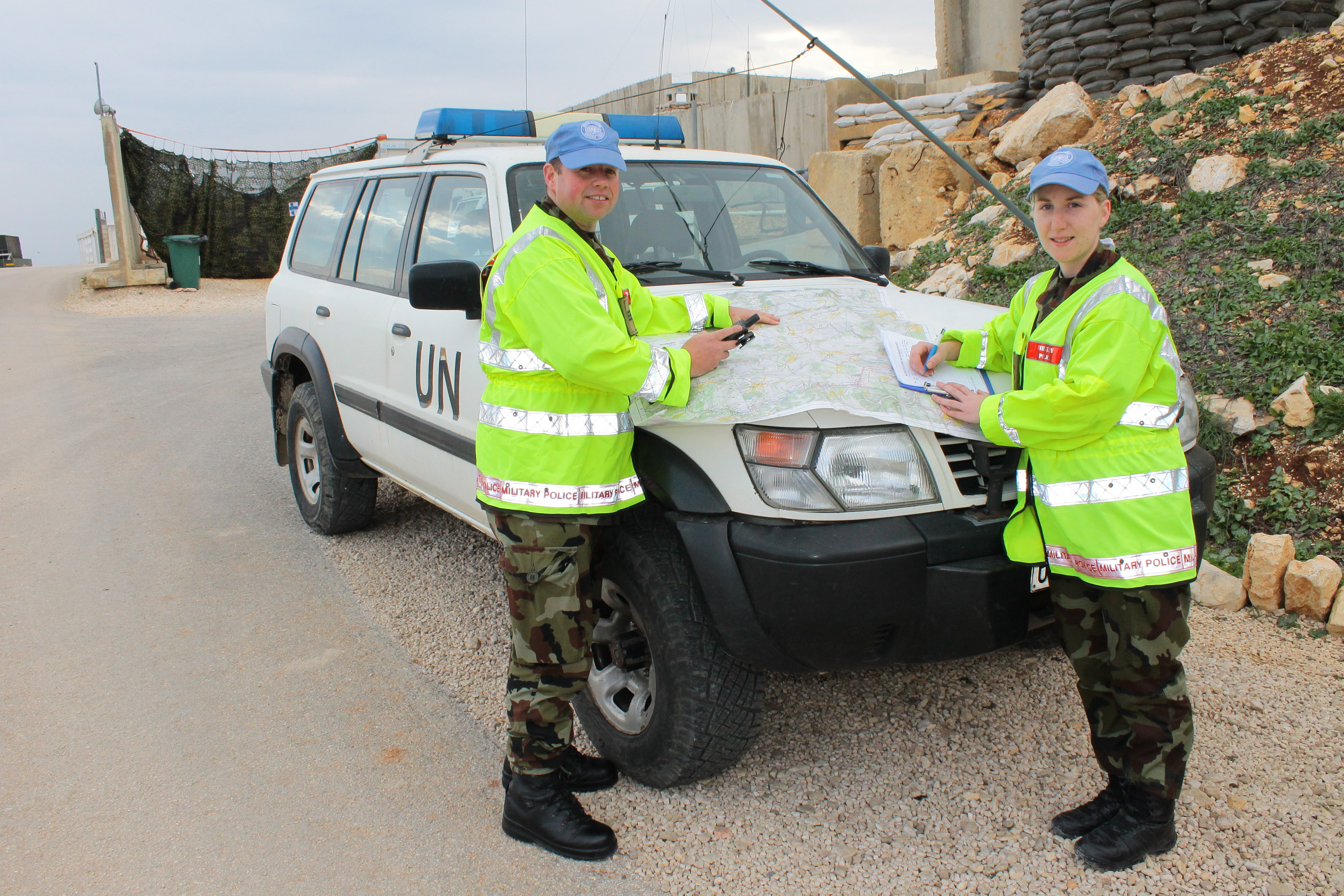
Irish Military Police Section, 47th Infantry Group of UNIFIL in Lebanon

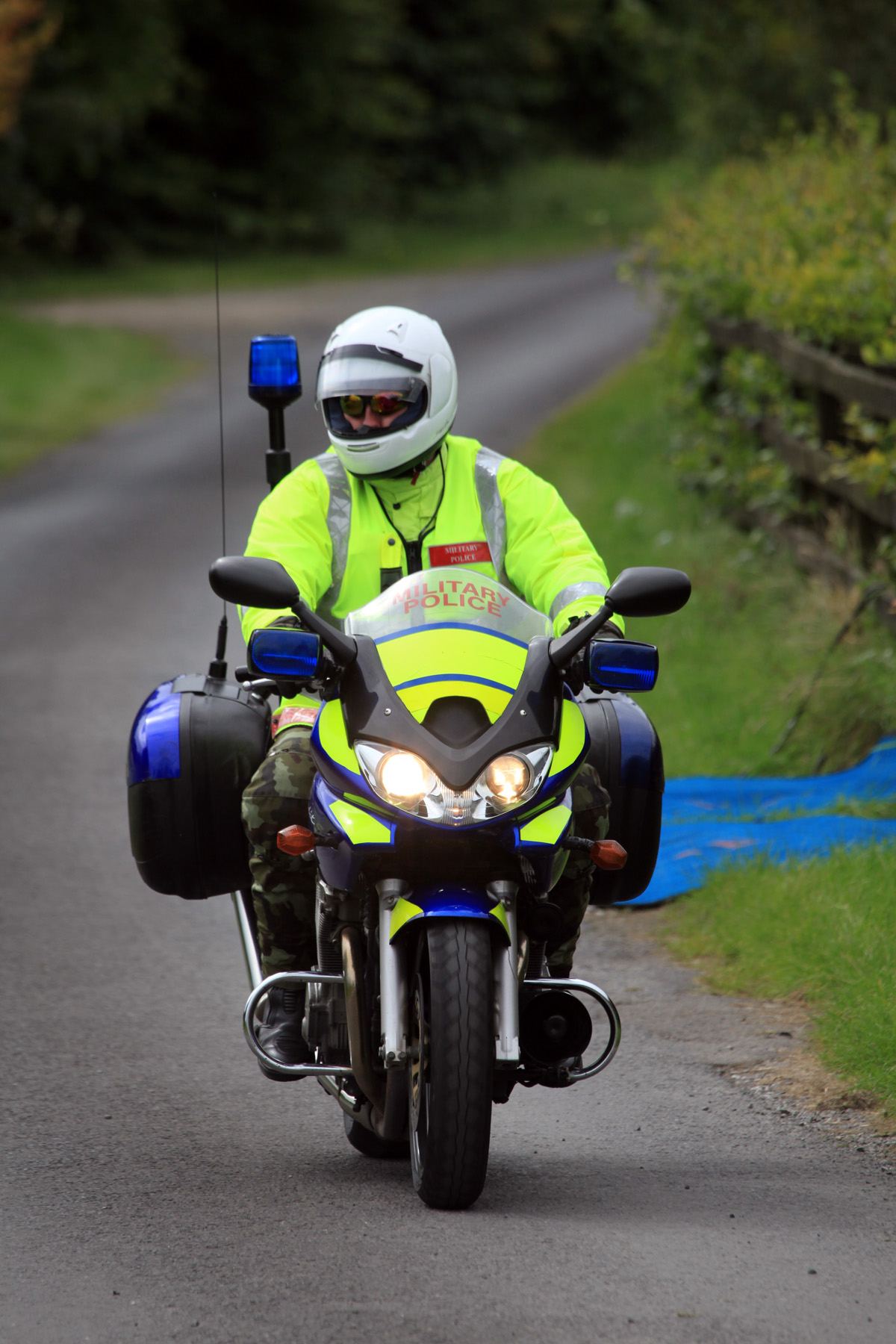
Military Police Corps motorcycle outrider

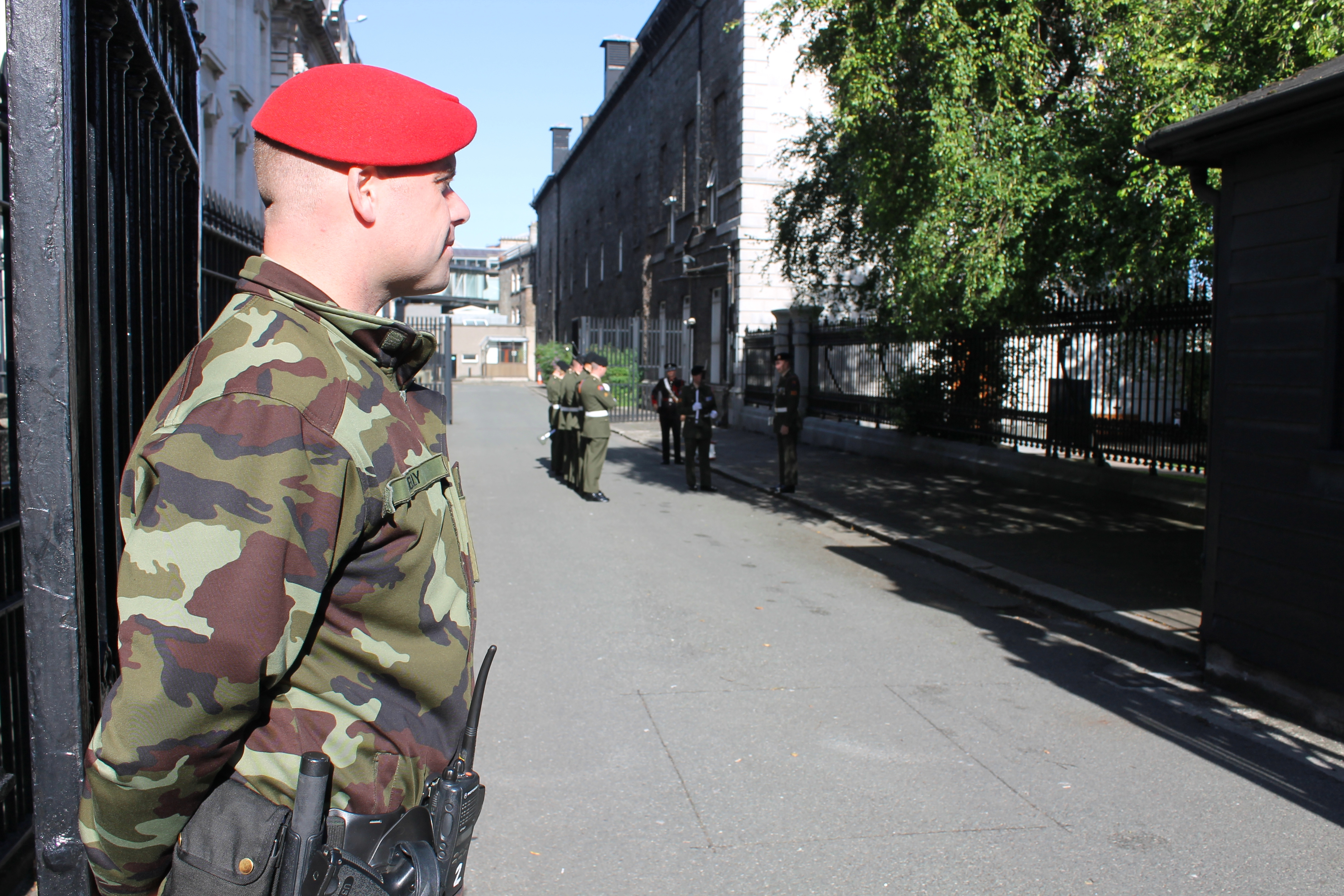
An armed MP soldier on duty at Government Buildings

The Military Police Corps (MP) (Irish: Cór Póiliní an Airm, PA) is the corps of the Irish Defence Forces responsible for the provision of policing service personnel and providing a military police presence to forces while on exercise and deployment. Its tasks increase during wartime to include traffic control organisation and POW and refugee control. The Military Police are distinguished from other units by their wearing of a red beret.

The Military Police enjoy a close working relationship with the Garda Síochána at both national and local levels, with the Gardaí providing training in criminal investigation to the corps.

== History ==
The MPC was first established in 1922 during the Irish Civil War when they took over military police duties from British troops before the corps was fully established in 1923.

=== Incidents ===
In 2011, the MPC reported that a Corporal on guard duty in Dublin in the Government Buildings committed suicide on 27 December 2010.

== Organisation ==
The Corps has three regular army companies and one special-purpose company:

- 1st Brigade Military Police Company
- 2nd Brigade Military Police Company
- Defence Forces Training Centre (DFTC) Military Police Company
- Military Police Government Buildings Company

The two brigade companies provide general policing support to each of the army's territorial brigades. The DFTC company provides similar support to the Defence Forces Training Centre.

The Air Corps and Naval Service now have Military Police Sections dressed in their own distinctive uniforms.

Military Police are armed with the Heckler & Koch USP service pistol and Steyr AUG assault rifle.

=== Restructuring ===
The Irish Army reduced to a two brigade structure in 2012, and the Military Police have also been reduced, based in the 1st Southern and 2nd Northern Brigades.

Units disbanded in the Defense Forces Re-organisation of 2012:

- 4th Brigade Military Police Company (2012)
- Military Police Section, Air Corps. Attached to the Irish Air Corps (2012)
- Military Police Section, Naval Service. Attached to the Irish Naval Service (2012)
- 31st Reserve Military Police Company (2012)
- 54th Reserve Military Police Company (2012)
- 62nd Reserve Military Police Company (2012)

== Equipment ==
=== Weapons ===
Name	Origin	Type	Caliber	Photo
Pistol
Heckler & Koch USP	Germany	Semi-automatic Pistol	9×19mm	
Assault rifle
Steyr AUG	Austria	Assault Rifle	5.56×45mm	

=== Uniform ===
MPC soldiers wear the red beret as standard, both regular and reserve.

== See also ==
- Military police#Ireland
