= Dublin Harbour Police =

Agency overview
- Formed: 1847

Jurisdictional structure
- Operations jurisdiction: Ireland

Website
- dublinport.ie

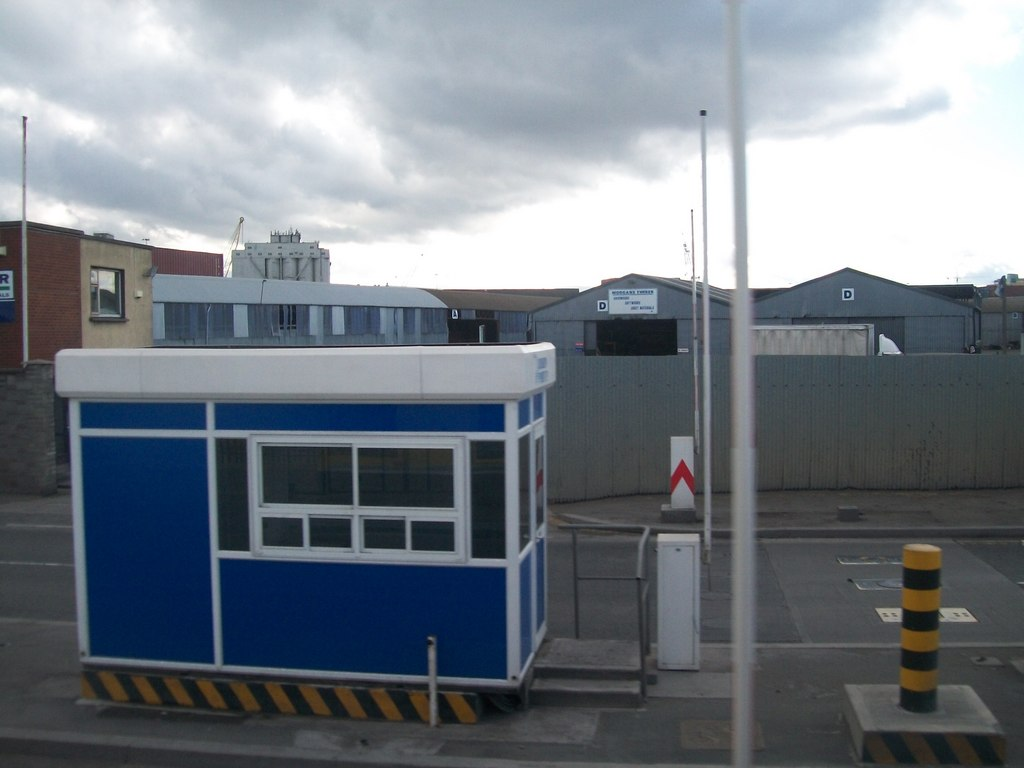
Security Checkpoints in Promenade Road

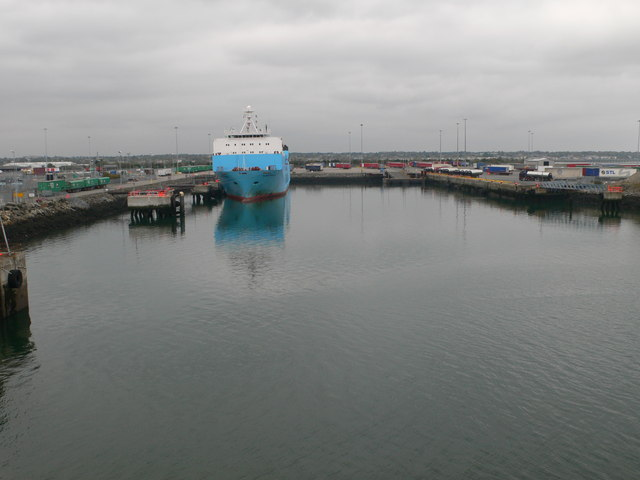
Dublin Harbour

The Dublin Harbour Police is a small, specialised police force in Dublin Port, Ireland operating under the jurisdiction of the Dublin Port Company. They police an area of approximately one thousand acres.

The force has the power of arrest under Section 59 of the Harbours Act 1996 , to arrest persons in connection with offences under the Act, although they are then required to hand them over to the Garda Síochána. Prior to the passage of the Act, the Harbour Police were under the employ of the Dublin Port and Docks Board and were sworn as constables under the Harbour, Docks & Piers Clauses Act 1847.

In 2008, because Dublin Port Company was unwilling or unable to pay the wages of officers, the vast majority (at least 20) officers were made redundant (after a voluntary arrangement of over 200,000 euro paid to each officer) Access control will be undertaken by contracted private security companies, however at least three officers are legally obliged to remain at the port to enforce bye-laws.

A new garda station was with accommodation was opened for the Garda Immigration Unit in 2023. Minister for Justice Helen McEntee opened the building on the 10th of November.

== See also ==
- Dun Laoghaire Harbour Police
