= Outline of Northern Ireland =

Country of the United Kingdom

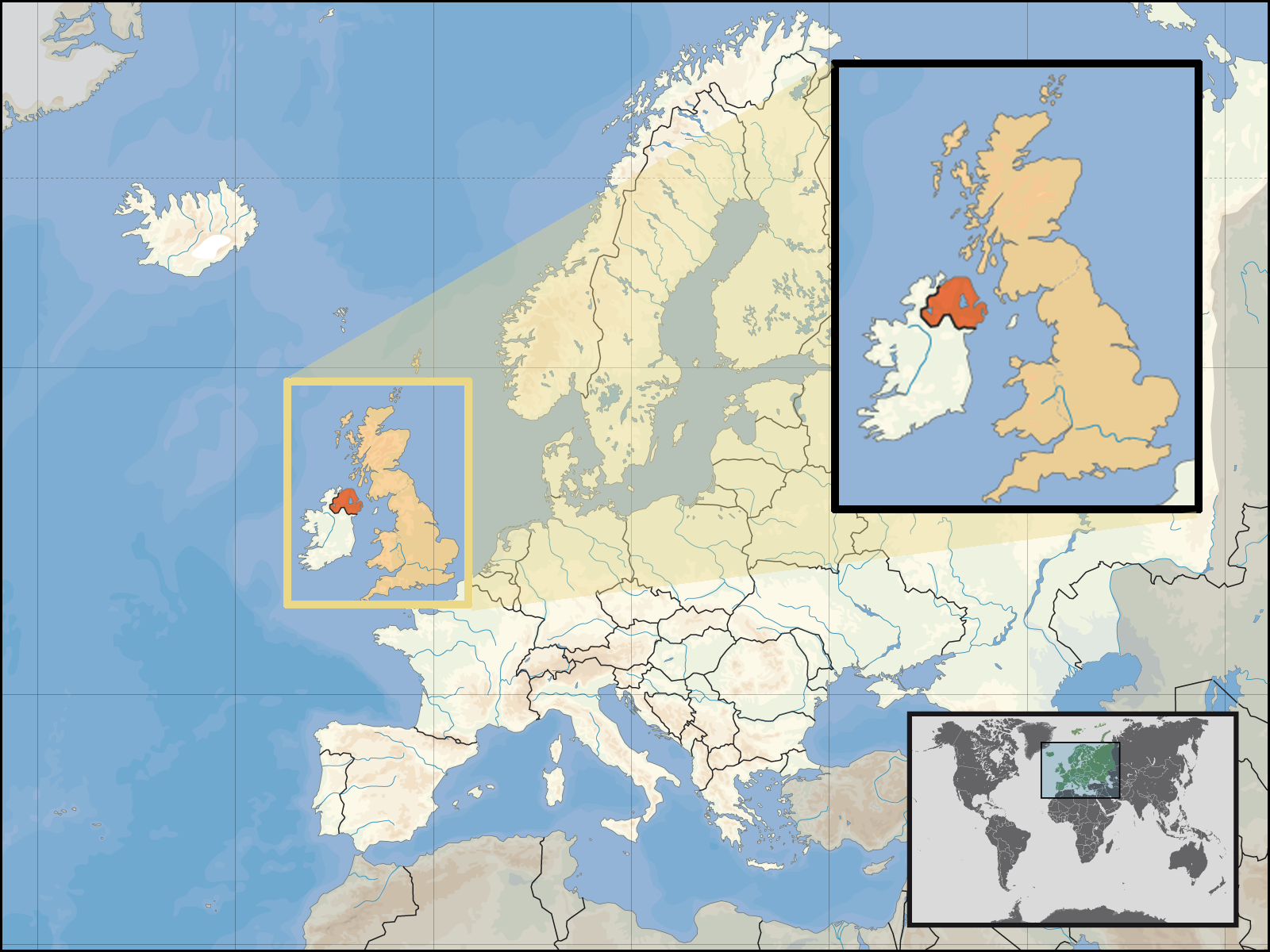
Location of Northern Ireland (orange) – in the European continent (camel & white) – in the United Kingdom (camel)

The following outline is provided as an overview of and topical guide to Northern Ireland.

Northern Ireland – one of the four countries of the United Kingdom. Situated in the northeast of the island of Ireland, it shares a border with the Republic of Ireland to the south and west. At the time of the 2001 UK census, its population was 1,685,000, constituting about 30% of the island's total population and about 3% of the population of the United Kingdom.

Northern Ireland was created as a distinct division of the United Kingdom on 3 May 1921 under the Government of Ireland Act 1920, although its constitutional roots lie in the 1800 Act of Union between Great Britain and Ireland.

Northern Ireland was for many years the site of a violent and bitter ethno-political conflict – the Troubles – which was caused by divisions between Irish nationalists, who are predominantly Roman Catholic, and unionists, who are predominantly Protestant. Unionists want Northern Ireland to remain part of the United Kingdom, while nationalists wish it to be politically reunited with the rest of Ireland. Since the signing of the "Good Friday Agreement" in 1998, most of the paramilitary groups involved in the Troubles have ceased their armed campaigns.

The Union Flag is the official Flag of Northern Ireland

Coat of arms of Northern Ireland (obsolete)

== General reference ==
- Common English country name: Northern Ireland
- Official English country name: Northern Ireland
- Common endonym:
  - Irish: Tuaisceart Éireann
  - Ulster Scots: Norlin Airlann
- Official endonym: Northern Ireland
- Adjectival: Northern Irish
- Demonym: Northern Irishman or Northern Irishwoman, Ulsterman or Ulsterwoman

== Geography of Northern Ireland ==
Geography of Northern Ireland

- Northern Ireland is: a constituent country of the United Kingdom. See Countries of the United Kingdom.
- Location
  - Atlantic Ocean
  - Northern Hemisphere
  - Western Hemisphere
  - Eurasia (but not on the mainland)
    - Europe
      - Northern Europe and Western Europe
        - British Isles
          - Ireland (the northeastern sixth of the island)
  - Extreme points of Northern Ireland
- Population of Northern Ireland: 1,759,000 (2008 est)
- Area of Northern Ireland: 13 843 km^{2} (5,345 square miles)
- Places in Northern Ireland
- Atlas of Northern Ireland

=== Environment of Northern Ireland ===
- Climate of Northern Ireland
- Department of the Environment
- Geology of Northern Ireland
- Protected areas of Northern Ireland
  - Special Areas of Conservation in Northern Ireland
  - National parks of Northern Ireland
- List of Areas of Special Scientific Interest in Northern Ireland
- Wildlife of Northern Ireland
  - Mammals of Northern Ireland

==== Natural geographic features of Northern Ireland ====
- Coastal landforms of Northern Ireland
- Islands of Northern Ireland
  - Boa Island
  - Cannon Rock
  - Coney Island, Lough Neagh
  - Copeland Islands
  - Derrywarragh Island
  - Devenish Island
  - Loughbrickland Crannóg
  - Lusty Beg Island
  - Lustymore Island
  - Ram's Island
  - Rathlin Island
  - White Island, County Fermanagh
- Lakes ("loughs") in Northern Ireland
- Mountains and hills of Northern Ireland
  - Hewitts in Northern Ireland
  - Marilyns in Northern Ireland
- Rivers of Northern Ireland
- World Heritage Sites in Northern Ireland

=== Regions of Northern Ireland ===
==== Administrative divisions of Northern Ireland ====
Administrative divisions of Northern Ireland

===== Municipalities of Northern Ireland =====
- Capital of Northern Ireland: Belfast
- List of settlements in Northern Ireland
- Cities in Northern Ireland
- Towns and villages in Northern Ireland

=== Demography of Northern Ireland ===
Demographics of Northern Ireland

== Government and politics of Northern Ireland ==
Politics of Northern Ireland

- Form of government:
- Capital of Northern Ireland: Belfast
- Taxation in Northern Ireland

=== Law and order in Northern Ireland ===
Northern Ireland law

- Capital punishment in Northern Ireland: There has been a history but currently none
- Courts of Northern Ireland
  - List of High Court Judges of Northern Ireland
- Crime in Northern Ireland
  - Prostitution in Northern Ireland
- Founding laws of Northern Ireland
  - Articles 2 and 3 of the Constitution of Ireland
  - Government of Ireland Act 1920
  - Belfast Agreement ("Good Friday Agreement")
  - Northern Ireland Act 1998
- Human rights in Northern Ireland
  - Freedom of religion in Northern Ireland
  - LGBT rights in Northern Ireland
- Law enforcement in Northern Ireland
  - Police Service of Northern Ireland (formerly the Royal Ulster Constabulary)
- Segregation in Northern Ireland

=== Local government in Northern Ireland ===
Local government in Northern Ireland

=== Political ideologies in Northern Ireland ===
- Nationalists
  - Republicanism
    - Irish National Liberation Army
    - Irish Republican Army
      - Official IRA
      - Provisional IRA
        - Continuity IRA
        - Real IRA
    - Irish Republican Brotherhood
- Unionists
  - Loyalist
    - Red Hand Commandos
    - Ulster Defence Association (Ulster Freedom Fighters)
      - Ulster Young Militants
    - Ulster Volunteer Force
      - Loyalist Volunteer Force

== History of Northern Ireland ==
=== By period ===
==== The Troubles ====
The Troubles

- 1981 Irish Hunger Strike
  - Michael Devine
  - Kieran Doherty
  - Francis Hughes
  - Martin Hurson
  - Kevin Lynch
  - Raymond McCreesh
  - Joe McDonnell
  - Thomas McElwee
  - Patsy O'Hara
  - Bobby Sands
- Johnny Adair
- Anti H-Block
- Armalite and ballot box strategy
- Arms Crisis
- Battle of the Bogside
- Birmingham pub bombings
  - Birmingham Six
- Blanket protest
- Bloody Friday
- Bloody Sunday
  - Bloody Sunday Inquiry
- Border Campaign (IRA)
- Boundary Commission (Ireland)
- British Military Intelligence Systems in Northern Ireland
- Chronology of the Northern Ireland Troubles
- Claudy bombing
- Combined Loyalist Military Command
- Conflict Archive on the Internet
- Corporals killings
- Council of Ireland
- Crumlin Road Gaol
- Directory of the Northern Ireland Troubles
- Dirty protest
- Denis Donaldson
- Drumcree Church
- Emergency Powers Act (Northern Ireland) 1926
- Denis Faul
- Pat Finucane
- Five techniques
- Flags and Emblems (Display) Act (Northern Ireland) 1954
- Forced disappearance
- Martin Galvin
- Government of Ireland Act 1920
- Governor of Northern Ireland
- Guildford pub bombing
  - Guildford Four
- Historical Enquiries Team
- Holy Cross dispute
- Independent Commission on Policing for Northern Ireland
- Independent International Commission on Decommissioning
- Irish War of Independence
- Kingsmill massacre
- Lord Mountbatten
- Loyalist Association of Workers
- Maguire Seven
- Maze prison (also known as Long Kesh)
- Michael McKevitt
- Danny McNamee
- Milltown Cemetery attack
- George Mitchell
- Mitchell Principles
- Murder triangle
- NORAID
- Northern Campaign (IRA)
- Northern Ireland Civil Rights Association
- Northern Ireland Constitution Act 1973
- Northern Ireland Constitutional Convention
- Northern Ireland Forum
- Northern Ireland peace process
- 1973 Northern Ireland referendum
- 1998 Northern Ireland referendum
- Official Sinn Féin
- Omagh bombing
- Operation Demetrius (also known as Internment)
- Operation Motorman
- Peace lines
- People's Democracy (Ireland)
- Plan Kathleen
- Provisional IRA campaign 1969–1997
- Provisional IRA South Armagh Brigade
- Remembrance Day Bombing
- Repartition of Ireland
- Saor Uladh
- Sean O'Callaghan
- Shoot-to-kill policy in Northern Ireland
- Stakeknife
  - Freddie Scappaticci
- Stevens Report
- Sunningdale Agreement
- Supergrass
- TUAS
- Tara
- Thiepval Barracks
- Third Force
- Tout
- Ulster Clubs
- Ulster Defence Regiment
- Ulster Defence Volunteers
- Ulster Project
- Ulster Resistance
- Ulster Special Constabulary
- Ulster Unionist Labour Association
- Ulster Workers Council
- Ulster Workers' Council Strike
- Ulsterisation
- Unity
- Warrenpoint ambush

=== By region ===
==== By county ====
- History of County Antrim
- History of County Armagh
- History of County Fermanagh
- History of County Londonderry
- History of County Tyrone

==== By municipality ====
- History of Belfast

=== By subject ===
- History of the Jews in Northern Ireland
- History of local government in Northern Ireland

== Culture of Northern Ireland ==
Culture of Northern Ireland

- Celtic calendar
- Cultural icons of Northern Ireland
  - Harp
  - Red Hand of Ulster
  - Shamrock
- Ethnic minorities in Northern Ireland
- Gardens in Northern Ireland
- Marriage in Northern Ireland
- Media in Northern Ireland
- Irish mythology
  - Cúchulainn
  - Ulster Cycle
- Museums in Northern Ireland
  - The Ormeau Baths Gallery
  - The Ulster Museum
- National symbols of Northern Ireland
  - Coat of arms of Northern Ireland
  - Flags used in Northern Ireland
    - Flag of Northern Ireland
  - Great Seal of Northern Ireland
  - National anthem of Northern Ireland
- Parades in Northern Ireland
- People of Northern Ireland
  - List of Northern Irish people
  - Celt
    - Modern Celts
  - Irish diaspora
  - Gaels
  - Irish people
    - List of Irish people
  - Irish Traveller
- Prostitution in Northern Ireland
- Public holidays in Northern Ireland
  - Saint Patrick's Day
- Other
  - Apprentice Boys of Derry
  - The Orange Order
  - Orange walk
  - Royal Black Preceptory

=== Architecture in Northern Ireland ===
Architecture of Northern Ireland

- List of monastic houses in Ireland
- Castles in Northern Ireland
- Cathedrals in Northern Ireland
- Cenotaphs in Northern Ireland
- National Trust properties in Northern Ireland
- Historic houses in Northern Ireland
- Market houses in Northern Ireland
- Shopping centres in Northern Ireland
  - Victoria Square Shopping Centre
- High-rise buildings in Northern Ireland
  - Obel Tower
  - Windsor House

=== Art in Northern Ireland ===
Art in Northern Ireland

  - Artists of Northern Ireland
- Cinema of Northern Ireland
  - Cinema of Ireland
  - Cinema of the United Kingdom
  - Films set in Northern Ireland
- Dance in Northern Ireland
- Folk art of Northern Ireland
  - Banners in Northern Ireland
  - Cenotaphs in Northern Ireland
  - Murals in Northern Ireland
- Literature of Northern Ireland
- Poetry of Northern Ireland
- Television in Northern Ireland
- Theatre in Northern Ireland
  - Irish dramatists

==== Music of Northern Ireland ====
Music of Northern Ireland

- Folk music of Northern Ireland
  - List of Irish ballads
    - Billy Boys
    - The Boyne Water
    - Come Out Ye Black and Tans
    - Danny Boy
    - Four Green Fields
    - Ireland's Call
    - Lillibullero
    - Londonderry Air
    - The Men Behind the Wire
    - The Mountains of Mourne
    - The Patriot Game
    - There Were Roses
    - The Town I Loved So Well
    - The Sash
    - Star of the County Down

=== Cuisine of Northern Ireland ===
Cuisine of Northern Ireland

- Barmbrack
- Irish breakfast
- Irish stew
- Irish whiskey
- Pork in Ireland
- Potato bread
- Soda bread
- Ulster fry
- Veda bread
- Dulse
- Yellowman (candy)

=== Language in Northern Ireland ===
- Languages of Northern Ireland
  - Irish language in Northern Ireland
- Pejoratives
  - Fenian
  - Millie
  - MOPE
  - Spide
  - Taig
  - West Brit
  - Hun
  - Orangie
  - Prod

=== Religion in Northern Ireland ===
Religion in Northern Ireland

==== Religious places ====
- List of monastic houses in Ireland
- Cathedrals in Ireland
- Cemeteries in Northern Ireland
- Cenotaphs in Northern Ireland

==== Religions in Northern Ireland ====
- Bahá'í Faith in Northern Ireland
- Christianity in Northern Ireland
  - Association of Baptist Churches in Ireland
  - Church of Ireland
    - Church of Ireland dioceses
- Methodist Church in Ireland
- Non-subscribing Presbyterian Church of Ireland
- Presbyterian Church in Ireland
  - Church House
  - General Assembly
  - Irish Presbyterians
  - Moderator
  - Union Theological College
- Reformed Presbyterian Church (denominational group)
- Free Presbyterian Church of Ulster
- Roman Catholicism in Northern Ireland
    - Irish Catholic
    - Roman Catholic dioceses of Ireland
- Hinduism in Northern Ireland
- Islam in Northern Ireland
- History of the Jews in Northern Ireland
- Primates
  - Primate of All Ireland
  - Primate of Ireland

=== Sport in Northern Ireland ===
Sport in Northern Ireland

- Cricket in Northern Ireland
  - Northern Ireland cricket team
- Football in Northern Ireland
  - Irish Football Association
  - Irish Football League
  - Northern Ireland national football team
- Gaelic Games
  - Gaelic Athletic Association
  - Ulster GAA
  - All-Ireland Senior Football Championship
  - All-Ireland Senior Hurling Championship
- Rugby in Northern Ireland
  - Rugby union in Northern Ireland
    - Irish rugby union system
      - Pro14
      - AIB League
    - Ireland national rugby union team
- Special Olympics
  - 2003 Special Olympics World Summer Games
- Swim Ireland
- Tennis Ireland
- Basketball Ireland

== Economy and infrastructure of Northern Ireland ==
Economy of Northern Ireland

- Economic rank (by nominal GDP):
- Communications in Northern Ireland
  - Internet in Northern Ireland
- Currency of the United Kingdom: Pound sterling
- Tourism in Northern Ireland
- Water supply and sanitation in Northern Ireland

=== Transport in Northern Ireland ===
Transport in Northern Ireland

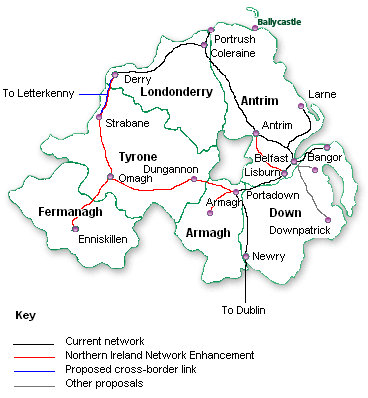
NI Network Enhancement. Proposals to expand Northern Ireland Railways to Armagh and the west.

- Airports in Northern Ireland
  - Belfast International Airport
  - City of Derry Airport
  - George Best Belfast City Airport
- Common Travel Area
- Rail transport in Northern Ireland
  - Armagh rail disaster
  - History of rail transport in Ireland
- Roads in Northern Ireland
  - List of A roads in Northern Ireland
  - List of B roads in Northern Ireland
- Translink
  - Metro (formerly Citybus)
  - Northern Ireland Railways
  - Ulsterbus

== Education in Northern Ireland ==
Education in Northern Ireland

- Boards of Education
  - Belfast Education and Library Board
  - North Eastern Education and Library Board
  - South Eastern Education and Library Board
  - Southern Education and Library Board
  - Western Education and Library Board
- Council for the Curriculum, Examinations and Assessment
- Department of Education
- Department for Employment and Learning
- Integrated Education
- List of Irish learned societies
- Union of Students in Ireland

=== Specific schools ===
- Public schools in Northern Ireland
  - Primary schools in Northern Ireland
  - Secondary schools in Northern Ireland
  - Grammar schools in Northern Ireland
  - Integrated schools in Northern Ireland
  - Gaelic medium primary schools in Northern Ireland
- Universities in Northern Ireland

=== Types of schools ===
- Grammar schools in the United Kingdom
- Private school
- Preparatory school

== Health in Northern Ireland ==
- Health and Social Care in Northern Ireland
  - Hospitals in Northern Ireland

== See also ==
- Outline of geography
- Outline of the Republic of Ireland
- Outline of the United Kingdom
- BT postcode area
