= St Patrick's Barracks =

- Ballymena

Site information
- Type: Barracks
- Owner: Ministry of Defence
- Operator: British Army

Location
- Location within Northern Ireland
- Coordinates: 54°56′26″N 06°14′24″W

Site history
- Built: 1937
- Built for: War Office
- In use: 1937-2008

St Patrick's Barracks was a military installation in Ballymena.

== History ==
The site was requisitioned by the War Office and the barracks were put into use as the depot of the Royal Ulster Rifles, who had relocated from Victoria Barracks, as soon as they opened in 1937. The barracks were used by the United States Army during the Second World War. The barracks reverted to use as depot of the Royal Ulster Rifles after the War and became the regional centre for infantry training as the North Irish Brigade Depôt in 1964. The barracks went on to be the home of the Royal Irish Rangers when it was formed in 1968 and of the Royal Irish Regiment when it was formed in 1992.

The barracks were closed in 2008 and the Imjin River Memorial, which had been located at the barracks, was moved to Belfast City Hall: the memorial commemorates Irish troops lost in the Battle of Chaegunghyon in January 1951 during the Korean War.

The site was given to the Northern Ireland Executive in 2012 and housing refurbishment was carried out. The site was the home of the Royal Irish Regiment Museum until it closed. Plans for a road link to the east of the site appeared in the planning submissions to Mid and East Antrim Council in November 2017.
