= List of cemeteries in Ireland =

This is a list of cemeteries in Ireland. It includes cemeteries in the Republic of Ireland and Northern Ireland. Only cemeteries which are notable and can be visited are included. Ancient burial grounds are excluded.

- Ballybough Cemetery, Dublin – old Jewish cemetery opened in 1718 last burial 1957
- Ballyoan Cemetery, Derry
- Belfast City Cemetery, Belfast, County Antrim
- Bodenstown Graveyard, County Kildare
- Bully's Acre, Dublin – former public cemetery near the Royal Hospital Kilmainham
- Cabbage Garden, Dublin
- Carrickbrennan Churchyard, Monkstown, County Dublin
- Clifton Street Cemetery, Belfast
- Curraghkippane Cemetery, Cork, including the Jewish Cemetery – burial site of members of Cork's Jewish community, victims of the Lusitania disaster, WWI soldiers, UCC anatomy donors.
- Conwal Cemetery, Letterkenny, County Donegal
- Croppies' Acre, Dublin – contains a memorial to the dead of the 1798 Rebellion
- Deans Grange Cemetery, County Dublin
- Dolphins Barn Jewish Cemetery, Dublin – active Jewish cemetery
- Donnybrook Cemetery, Donnybrook, Dublin
- Drumcondra Church Graveyard, Drumcondra, Dublin – burial place of architect James Gandon and Patrick Heeney (composer of the Irish national anthem)
- Friar's Bush Graveyard, Belfast
- Friends Burial Ground, Dublin – a Quaker burial ground in Blackrock, Dublin
- Glasnevin Cemetery, Dublin – this cemetery has over 1,500,000 people buried in it – many were victims of the great famine of 1845; there are also many prominent Irish figures buried here such as Michael Collins and Éamon de Valera
- Glencree German war cemetery, Glencree, County Wicklow
- Goldenbridge Cemetery, Goldenbridge, Dublin
- Grangegorman Military Cemetery, Dublin
- Huguenot Cemetery, Cork – 18th century cemetery for the Huguenot inhabitants of Cork city
- Huguenot Cemetery, Dublin
- Laraghbryan Cemetery, County Kildare
- Limerick Jewish graveyard, Castletroy, Limerick
- Merrion Cemetery, Bellevue, Dublin
- Milltown Cemetery, Belfast, County Antrim
- Mount Jerome Cemetery, Dublin
- Old Church Cemetery, Cobh, County Cork
- Roselawn Cemetery, Belfast
- Shanganagh Cemetery, Dublin
- St. Finbarr's Cemetery, Cork – Cork city's largest cemetery
- St. Fintan's Cemetery, Sutton, Dublin
- St. Kevin's Churchyard, Camden Row, Dublin
- Tea Lane Graveyard, County Kildare
