= Barney Hughes =

Irish industrialist and social campaigner (1808–1878)

Bernard "Barney" Hughes (8 July 1808 – 23 September 1878) was a nineteenth-century Irish industrialist, social campaigner and politician.

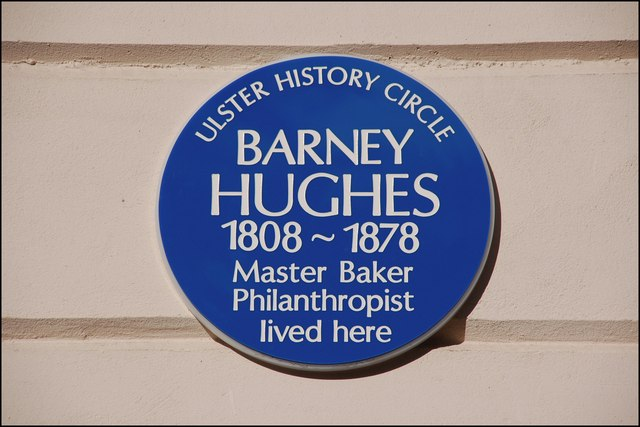
Plaque commemorating Hughes at his former Belfast home

Hughes was the second in a family of eight children of Peter Hughes and Catherine Quinn. His mother was from Blackwatertown, Co. Armagh. He was born in Armagh, with the family soon moving to Blackwatertown.

Hughes came to Belfast aged 18 in March 1827. For a number of years he worked his way up in the bakery business. Under the trading name of the "Railway and Model Bakeries", Hughes had a bakery and mill up and running in Donegall Street in 1840, followed by a second in Donegall Place in 1846, then a third on the Falls Road in 1850. By 1870 his was the largest baking and milling industry in Ireland.

Part of Hughes' continuing fame is due to his development and production of cheap and wholesome bread. The most famous item was the Belfast bap, more commonly known as Barney's Baps. His bread is recalled in the rhyme:

Barney Hughes' bread
Sticks to your belly like lead.
Not a bit of wonder
You fart like thunder
Barney Hughes' bread.

The rhyme was inspired by the consequences of the use of beans and peas in the recipe to keep the price of the bread low.

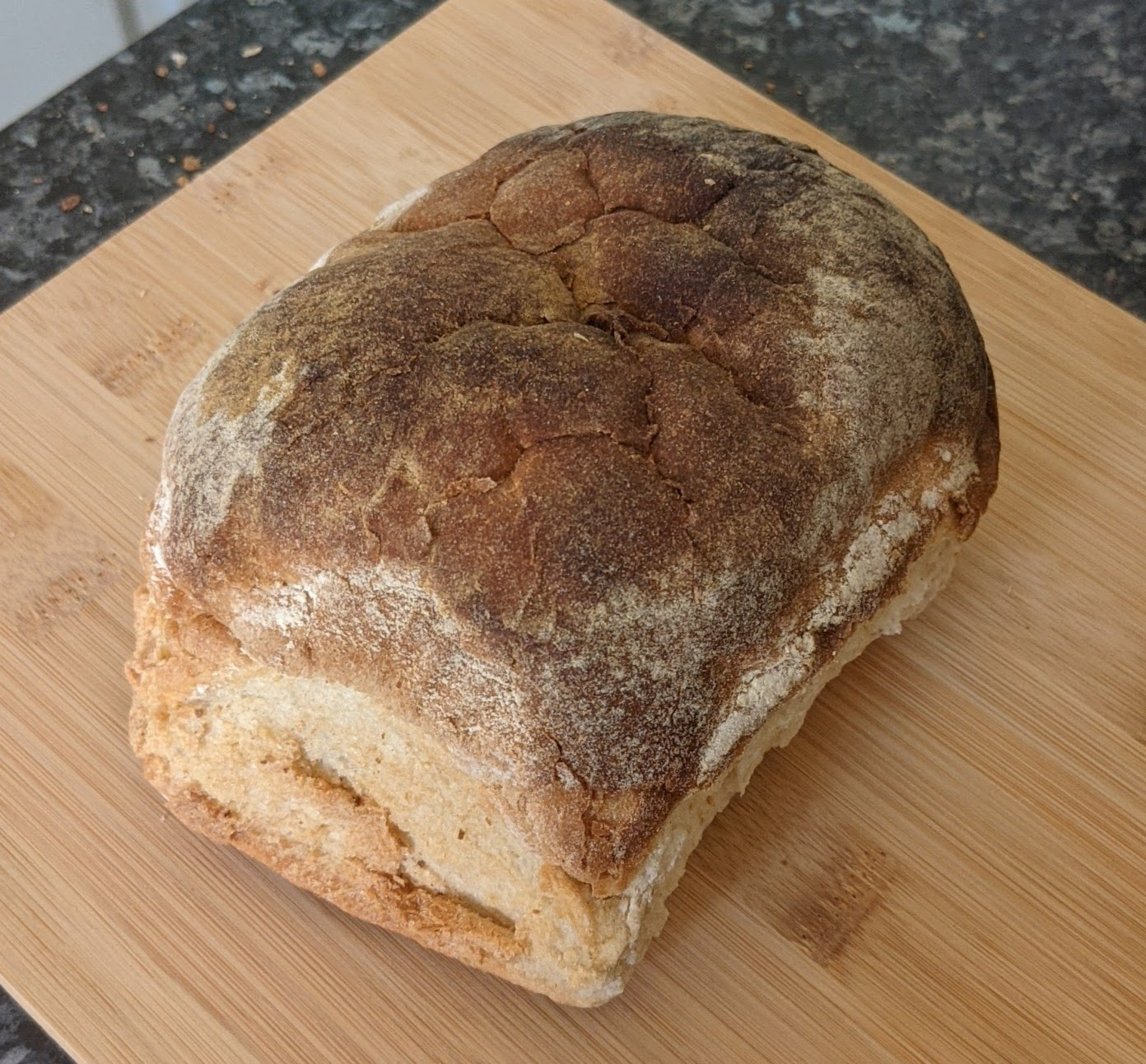
A Belfast bap

His Donegall Place premises in the heart of the city was often attacked by Protestant mobs. Hughes' third mill, located in Divis Street just below the lower Falls Road, was commonly called "Barney's Mill". After his death his son Edward took over the business and expanded it to a new site on the Springfield Road.

In his early years in Belfast, Hughes lived in Lancaster Street in the north of the city. 1852 saw him at no. 35 Queen Street in the city centre. By 1868 he had moved round the corner to a desirable residence in 11 College Square North. He also lived in Holywood.

Hughes was the first Catholic elected to Belfast Corporation and became a JP. A campaigner against sectarianism and for social justice, he gave evidence to the Royal Commission of Inquiry into serious sectarian riots of 1857 and 1864, thereby angering the Tory establishment in the city. Hughes informed the 1857 inquiry that the Catholic people were the "bones and sinew" of the city. Although he was sometimes in conflict with the Catholic Church, Hughes gave land for the building of St Peter's Cathedral in the Lower Falls. He gave a donation towards the erection of a statue, still known locally as the 'Black Man', of fiery anti-Catholic clergyman Dr Henry Cooke.

Hughes was married twice and had six children. He spoke Irish fluently and, like his father, supported Daniel O’Connell. Of the nationalist leader, he said: "If it were not for O'Connell I would not be in the position I am now in".

At his request, Hughes' funeral was private. Belfast Working Men's Institute, of which he was a trustee, paid him a tribute at its next AGM: "he was beloved by the working classes". Hughes is buried in Friar's Bush Graveyard, the oldest cemetery in Belfast.

In June 2007, a plaque commemorating Hughes was erected at his College Square North home.
