= Belfast City Hall =

Municipal building in Northern Ireland

- The Belfast City Hall in August 2017

General information
- Architectural style: Baroque Revival
- Classification

Listed Building – Grade A
- Designated: 27 November 1975
- Reference no.: HB 26/50/001
- Location: Donegall Square, Belfast, Northern Ireland
- Coordinates: 54°35′47″N 5°55′48″W
- Current tenants: Belfast City Council
- Construction started: 1898
- Completed: 1906
- Renovated: 2009
- Cost: Approx £360,000
- Client: Belfast Corporation

Height
- Height: Roof – 174 feet (53 m)

Design and construction
- Architect: Brumwell Thomas
- Quantity surveyor: WH Stephens
- Main contractor: H&J Martin

Belfast City Hall (Irish: Halla na Cathrach, Béal Feirste) is the civic building of Belfast City Council located in Donegall Square, Belfast, Northern Ireland. It faces North and effectively divides the commercial and business areas of the city centre. It is a Grade A listed building.

== History ==
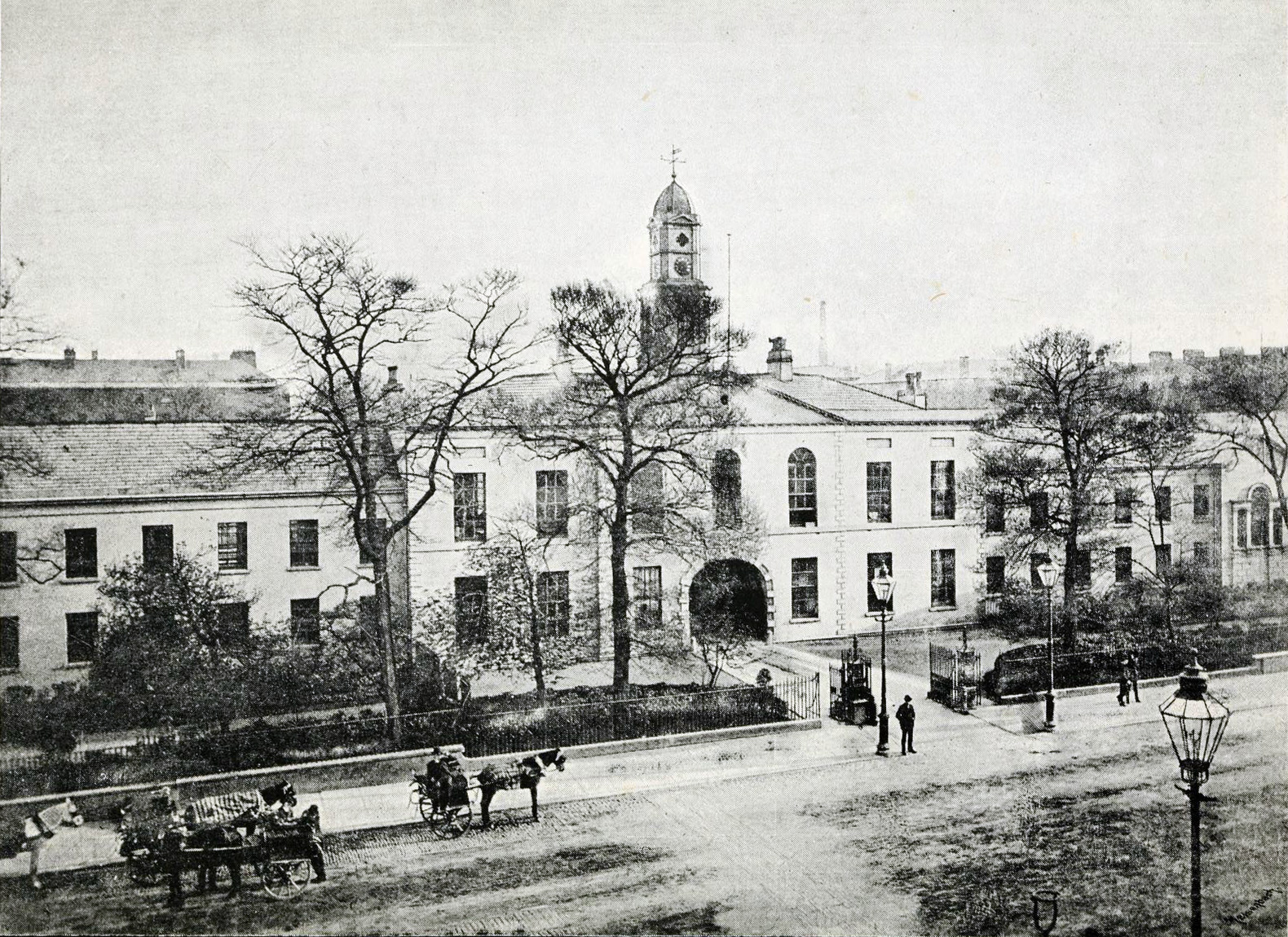
The White Linen Hall, or the Linen Hall Library as it was in 1888. Demolished to make way for the City Hall.

Belfast City Hall was commissioned to replace the Old Town Hall in Victoria Street. The catalyst for change came in 1888 when Belfast was awarded city status by Queen Victoria. This was in recognition of Belfast's rapid expansion and thriving linen, rope-making, shipbuilding and engineering industries. During this period Belfast briefly overtook Dublin as the most populous city in Ireland.

It was in this context that in the late 19th century the new city leaders formed the view that the Victoria Street building was not imposing enough and decided to commission a new building: the site they selected was once the home of the White Linen Hall, an important international Linen Exchange. The street that runs from the back door of Belfast City Hall through the middle of Linen Quarter is Linen Hall Street.

Belfast Corporation used their profits from the gas industry to pay for the construction of the Belfast City Hall. The building, which was designed by Sir Alfred Brumwell Thomas in the Baroque Revival style, was built in Portland stone at a cost of £369,000 and opened on 1 August 1906. Local firms H&J Martin and WH Stephens were among the companies involved in the design and construction. James G. Gamble, principal city architect with Belfast Corporation, was clerk of works for the erection of the City Hall c. 1896–1906.

In 1921 it was the provisional seat of the Parliament of Northern Ireland and on 22 June 1921 King George V made here the first state opening.

The city hall in Durban, South Africa is almost an exact replica of Belfast's City Hall. It was built in 1910 and designed by Stanley G. Hudson, who was inspired by the Belfast design. The Port of Liverpool Building, designed by Sir Arnold Thornely and completed in 1913, is another very close relative.

On 1 August 2006 the City Hall celebrated its centenary with a "Century of Memories" exhibition and family picnic day. On 3 December 2012, the City Council voted to limit the days that the Union Flag flies from City Hall to no more than 18 designated days. Since 1906, the flag had been flown every day of the year. The move was backed by the council's Irish nationalist councillors and by its Alliance Party councillors. It was opposed by the unionist councillors, who had enjoyed a majority on the council until the Northern Ireland local elections of 2011. On the night of the vote, unionist and loyalist protesters tried to storm the City Hall. They held protests throughout Northern Ireland, some of which became violent.

== Exterior ==
The grounds of City Hall: in the background are the dome at Victoria Square Shopping Centre and the Belfast Wheel.

The hall features towers at each of the four corners, with a lantern-crowned 173 ft (53 m) green copper dome in the centre. The pediment sculpture is by F. W. Pomeroy, assisted by local carver J. Edgar Winter, and features on the reverse side of the current series of £10, £20, £50 and £100 sterling banknotes issued by the Northern Bank.

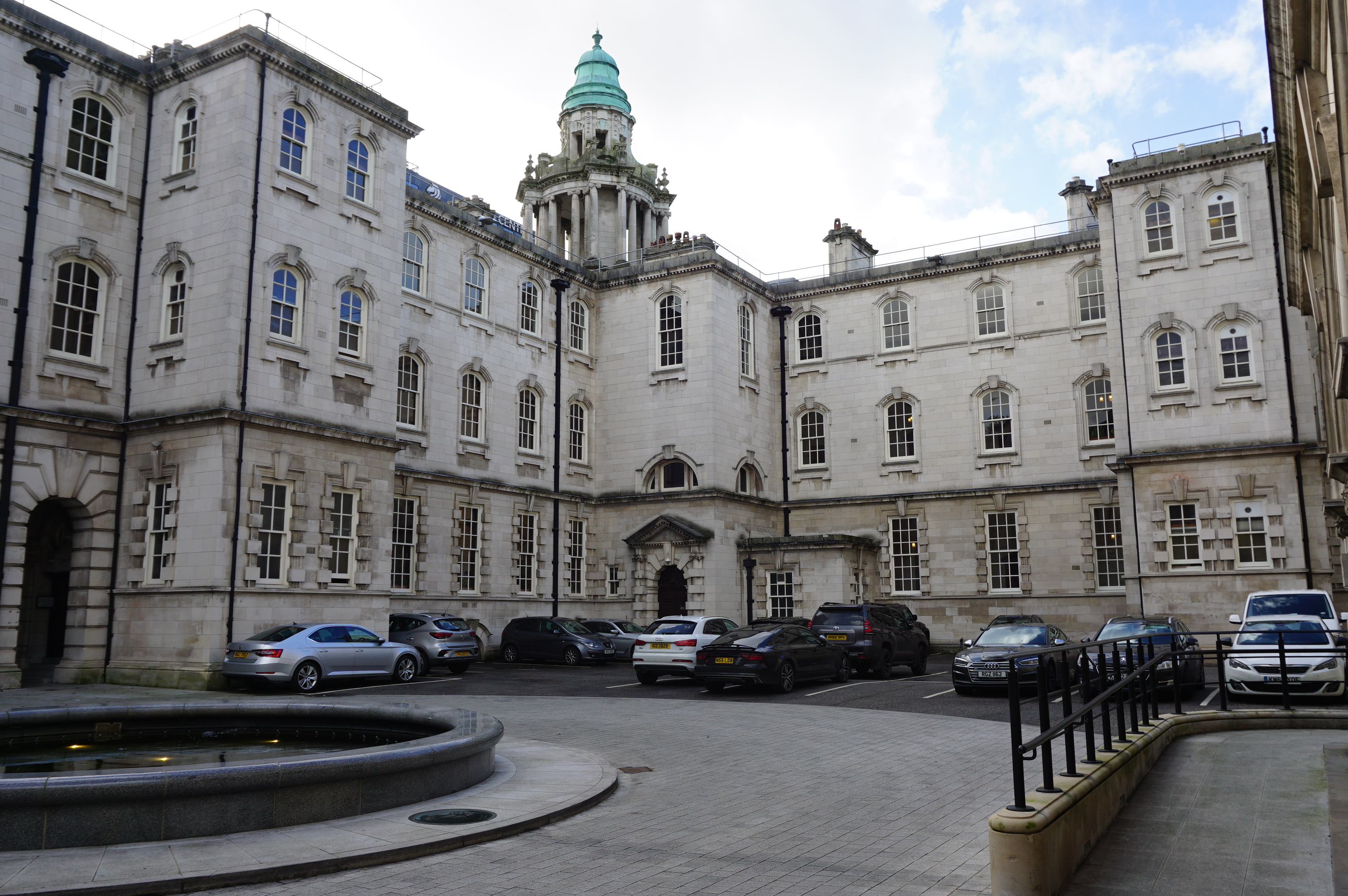
Inner Courtyard

== Interior ==
The interior has a number of notable features including the Porte-Cochère and Grand Entrance, the Grand Staircase, the Reception Room, Banqueting Hall and the Great Hall. The roof above the Great Hall was destroyed during the Belfast blitz on the night of 4/5 May 1941 and had to be rebuilt.

Carrara, Pavonazzo and Brescia marbles are used extensively throughout the building as are stained glass windows featuring among others the Belfast coat of arms, portraits of Queen Victoria and William III and shields of the provinces of Ireland. There is also a stained glass window commemorating the 36th (Ulster) Division.

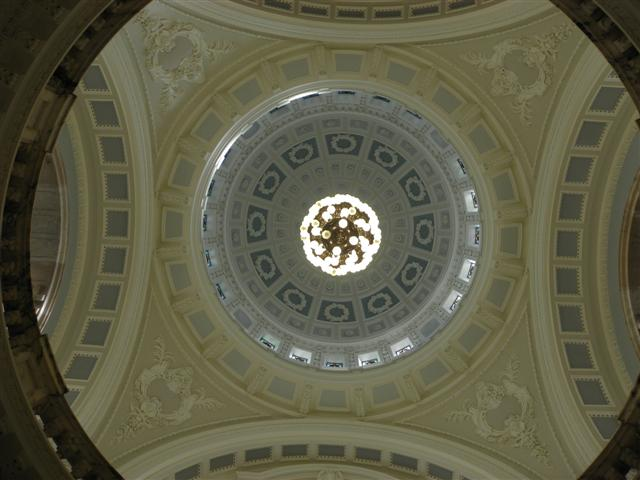
City Hall Dome

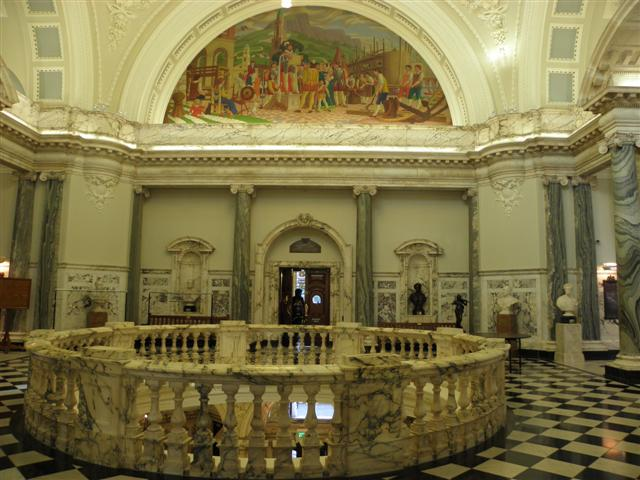
First floor Rotunda

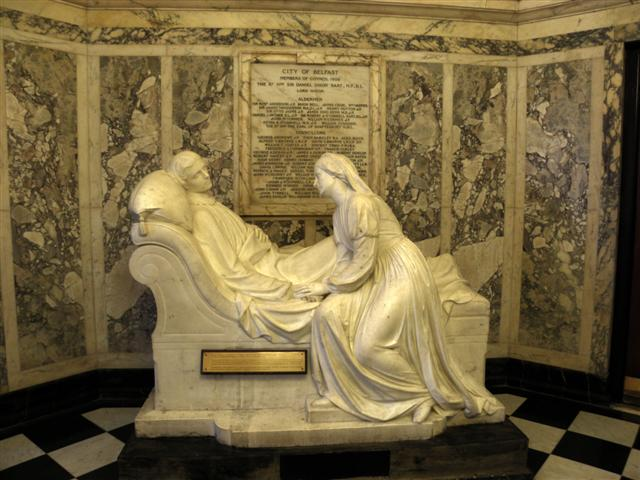
Sculpture of the Earl of Belfast

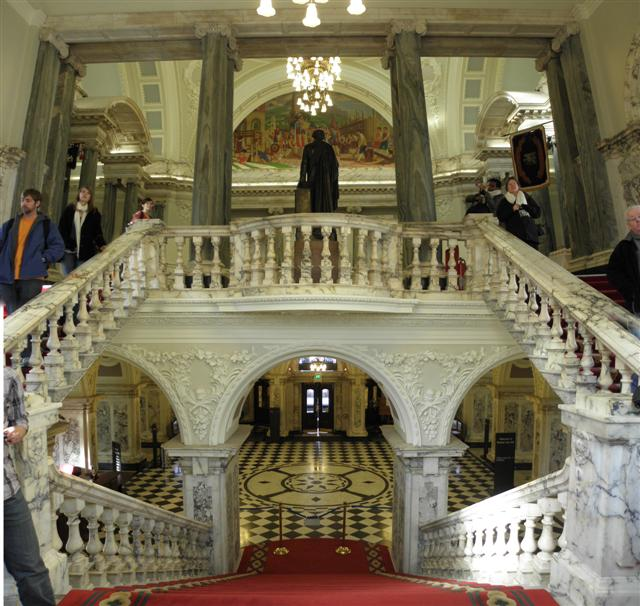
Central staircase

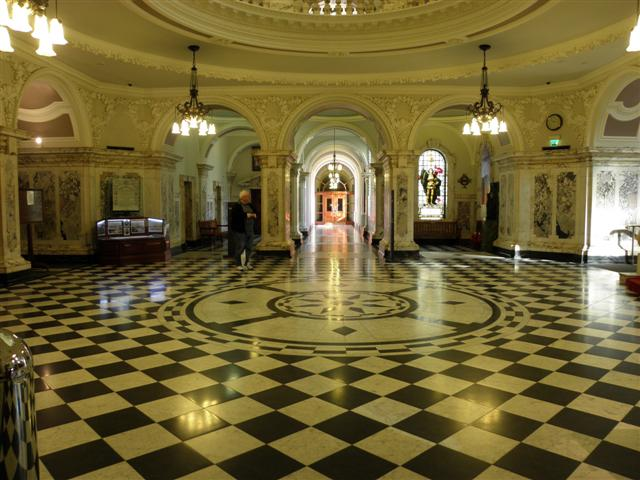
Main entrance

Parts of Belfast City Hall are open to the public, with a permanent exhibition opening in 2017. Visitors can also book guided tours of the City Hall with access to areas usually closed to the public.

== Grounds and public memorials ==
The memorial to Sir Edward Harland, the former head of the Harland & Wolff shipyard and Lord Mayor of Belfast, was sculpted by Sir Thomas Brock and unveiled by the Earl of Glasgow on 23 June 1903. The statue of Queen Victoria also by Brock was unveiled by King Edward VII on 27 July 1903. The Titanic Memorial in Belfast was dedicated in June 1920.

The grounds also house Northern Ireland's main war memorial, the Garden of Remembrance and Cenotaph, unveiled in 1929. There is also a granite column dedicated to the American Expeditionary Force, many of whom were based in Belfast prior to D-Day, unveiled in 1943.

A 6-foot-high (1.8 m) memorial to Leading Seaman James Magennis VC, made from Portland stone and bronze, was erected in the grounds in October 1999.

On 3 January 2006 Belfast City Councillors ratified a plan to erect a statue to the late Belfast footballer George Best in the grounds of the City Hall. Following approval from the Best family, the George Best Memorial Trust was created in December 2006. The trust's patron David Healy contributed £1,000 to the estimated total cost of £200,000.

In October 2007 a 60-metre (200 ft) Ferris wheel was constructed in the grounds, giving passengers panoramic views 200 ft (61 m) above the city. The wheel had 42 air-conditioned capsules, which could hold up to six adults and two children. The wheel finally closed at 6:00 pm on 11 April 2010 and was removed during May 2010.

In 2008, the Imjin River Memorial was relocated here when the St Patrick's Barracks in Ballymena closed. The memorial commemorates Irish troops lost in the Battle of Chaegunghyon in January 1951 during the Korean War.

On 8 March 2024, bronze statues of the anti-slavery campaigner, Mary Ann McCracken, and the trade unionist, Winifred Carney, were unveiled at a ceremony at Belfast City Hall to coincide with International Women's Day 2024. Mary Ann McCracken campaigned against slavery at Belfast docks until she was almost 90 years-old and Winifred Carney was a suffragist, committed trade unionist and political activist.

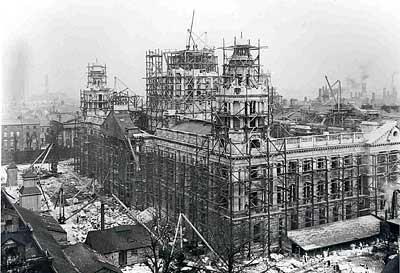
Under construction

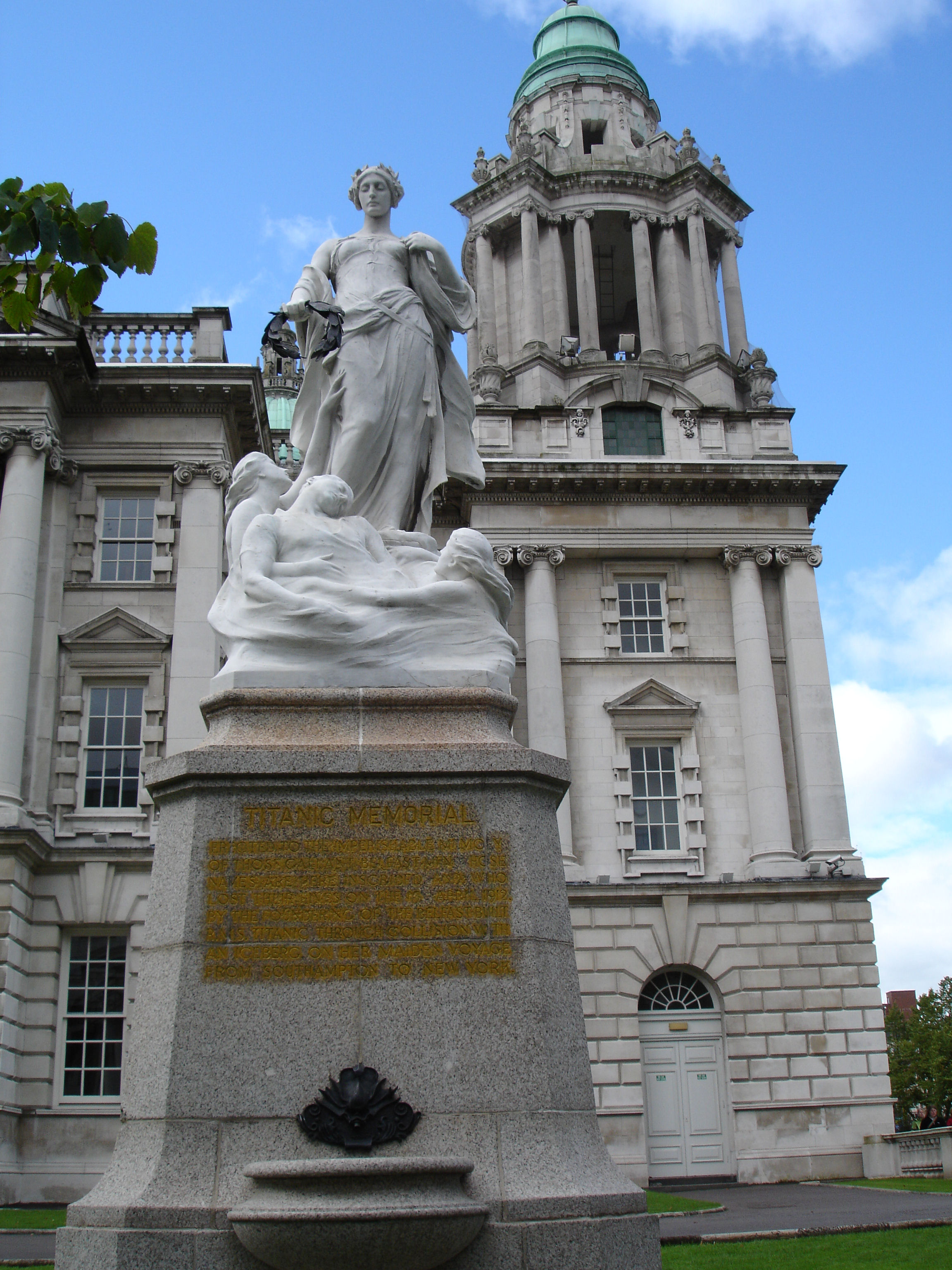
Belfast's – Titanic memorial

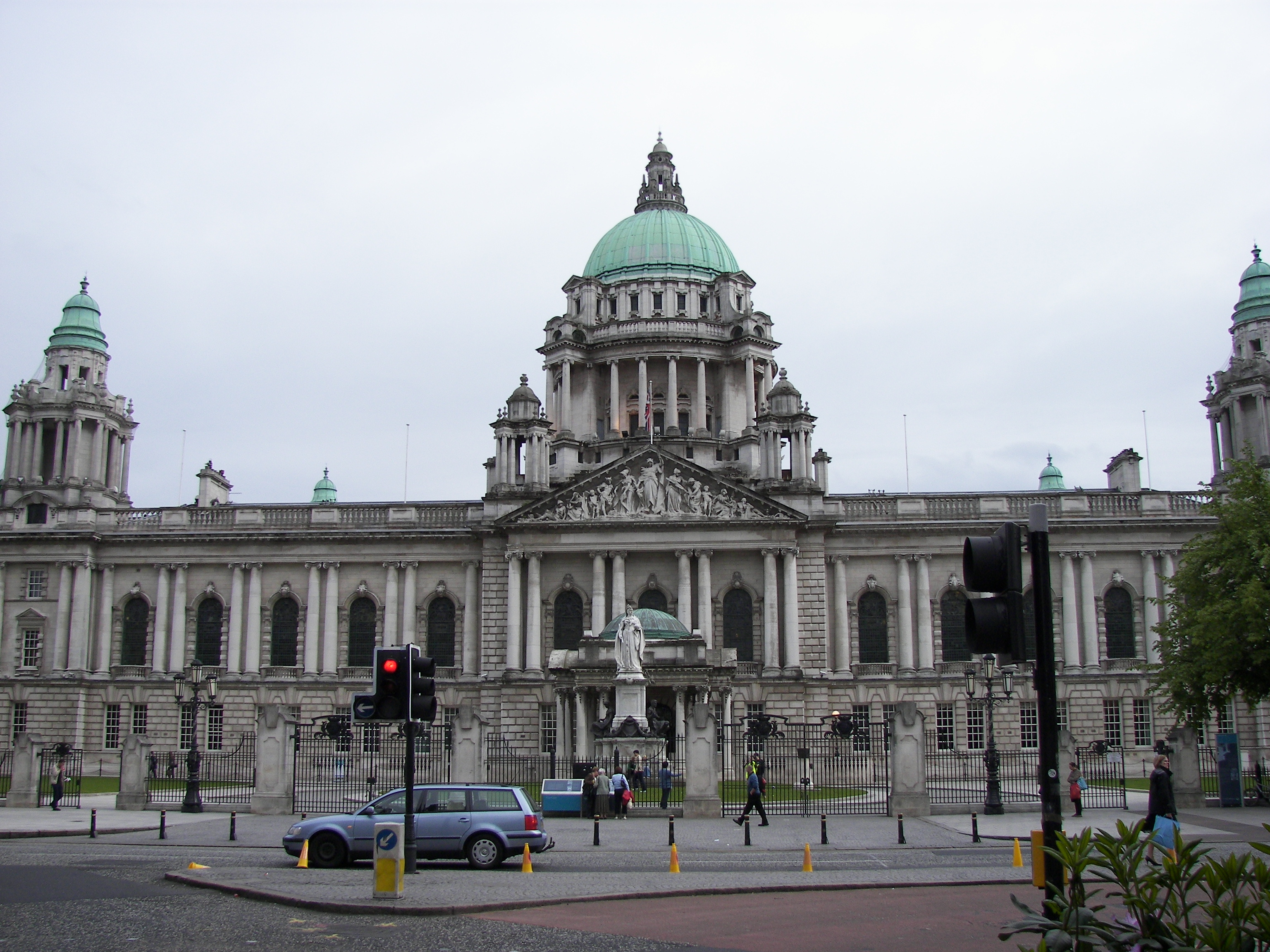
Front of the building

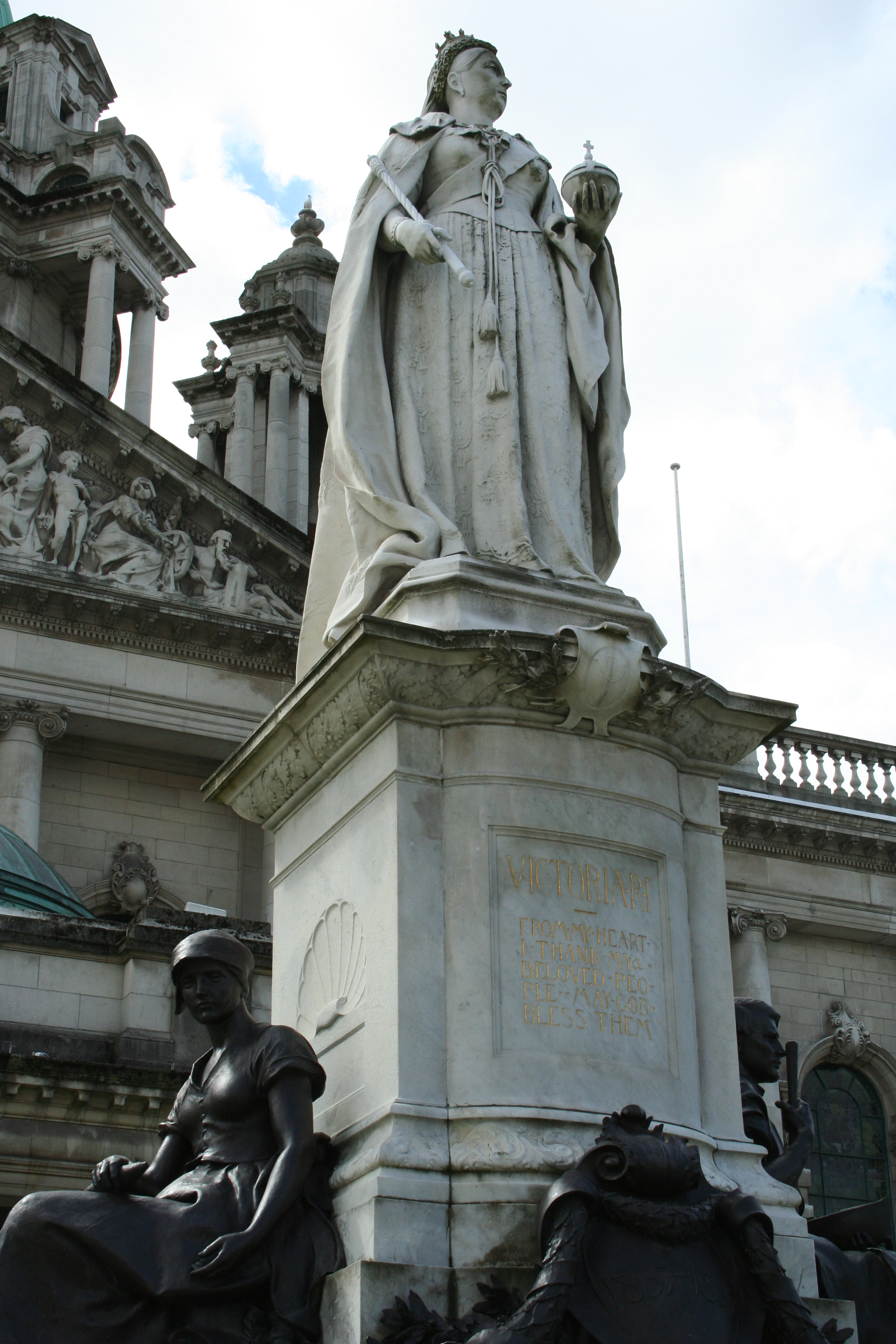
Monument to Queen Victoria

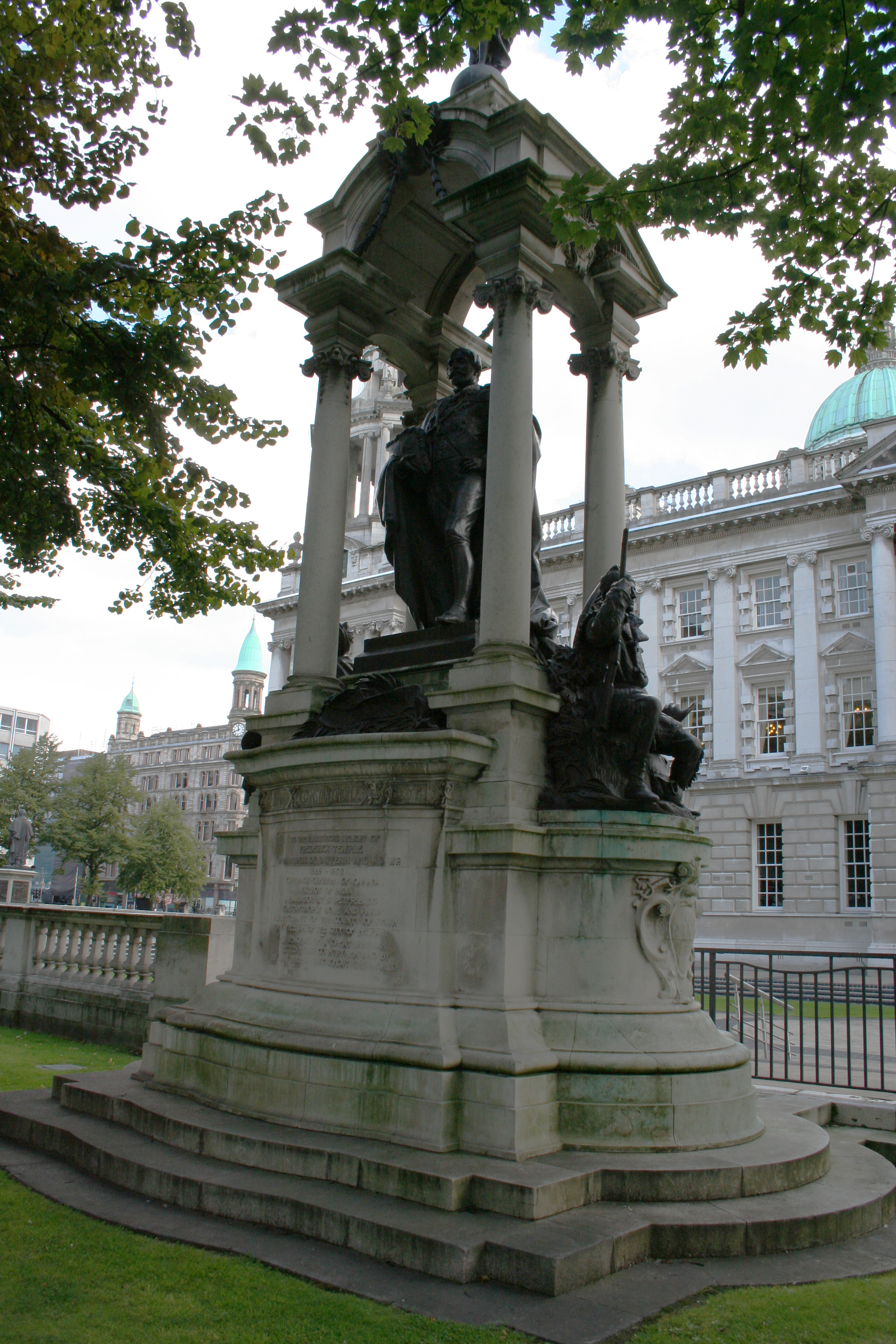
Lord Dufferin monument

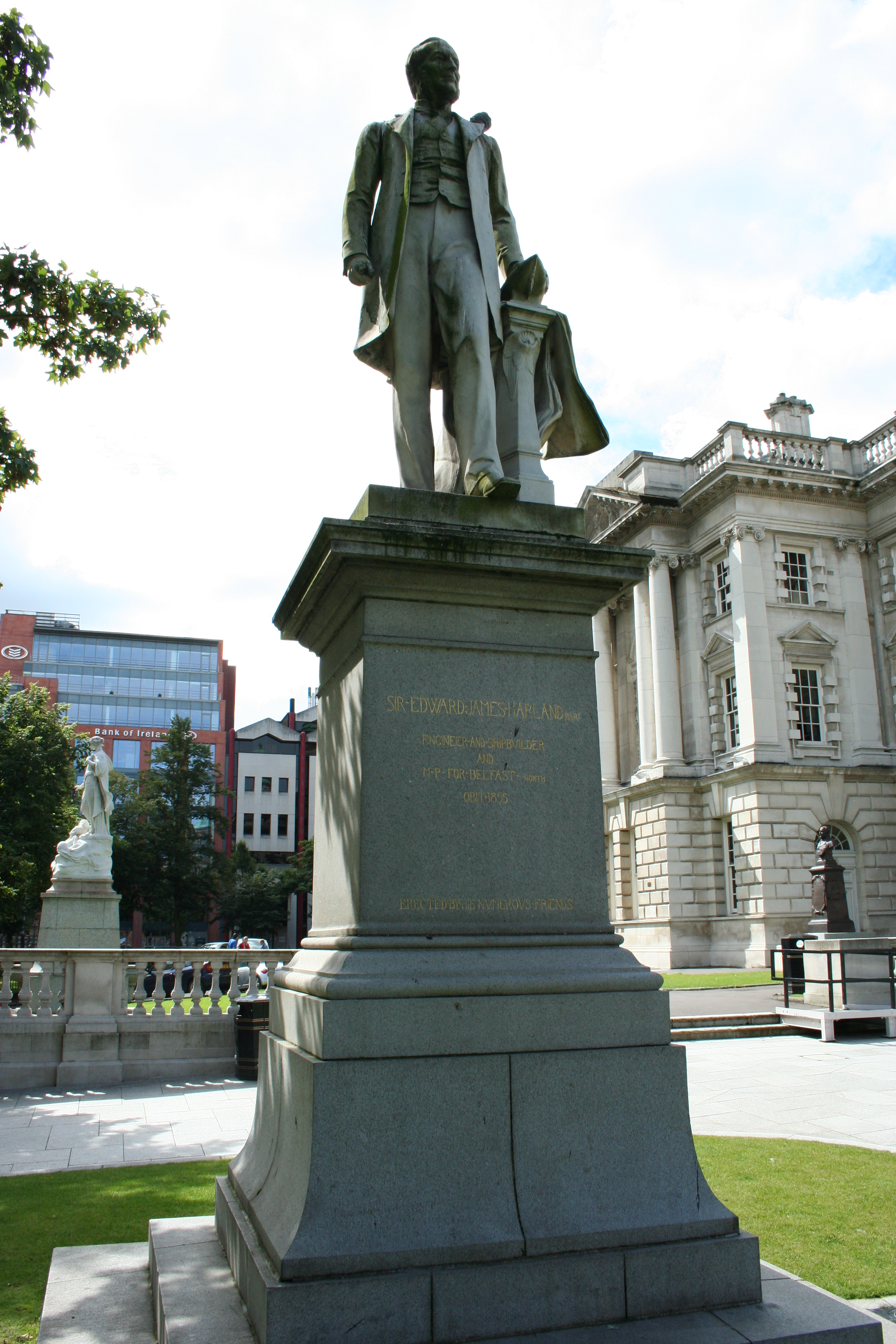
Statue of Edward James Harland, founder of Harland & Wolff

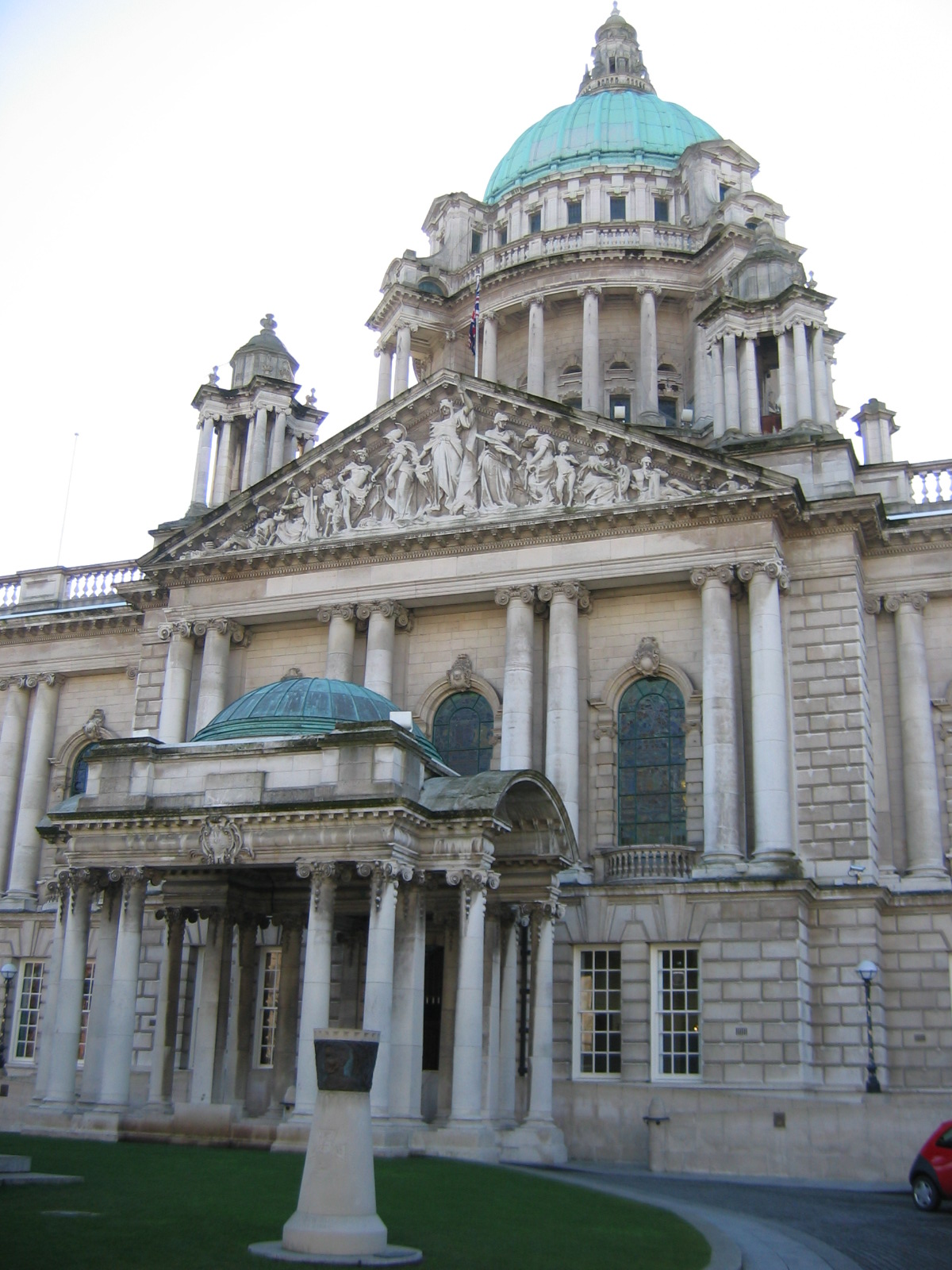
Memorial to James Magennis VC (2004)

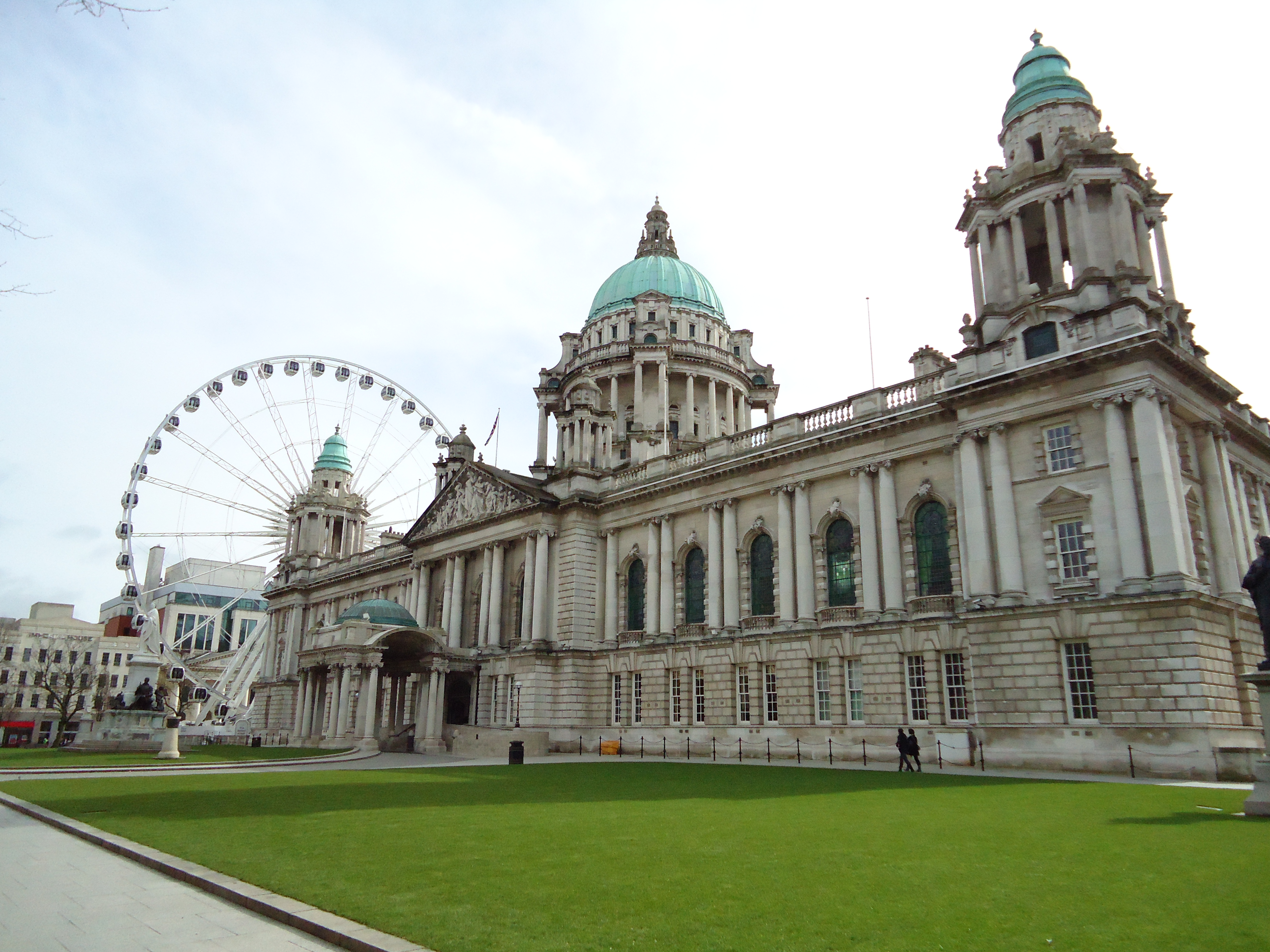
View showing Belfast City Hall with the Belfast Wheel to the side, Late March 2010

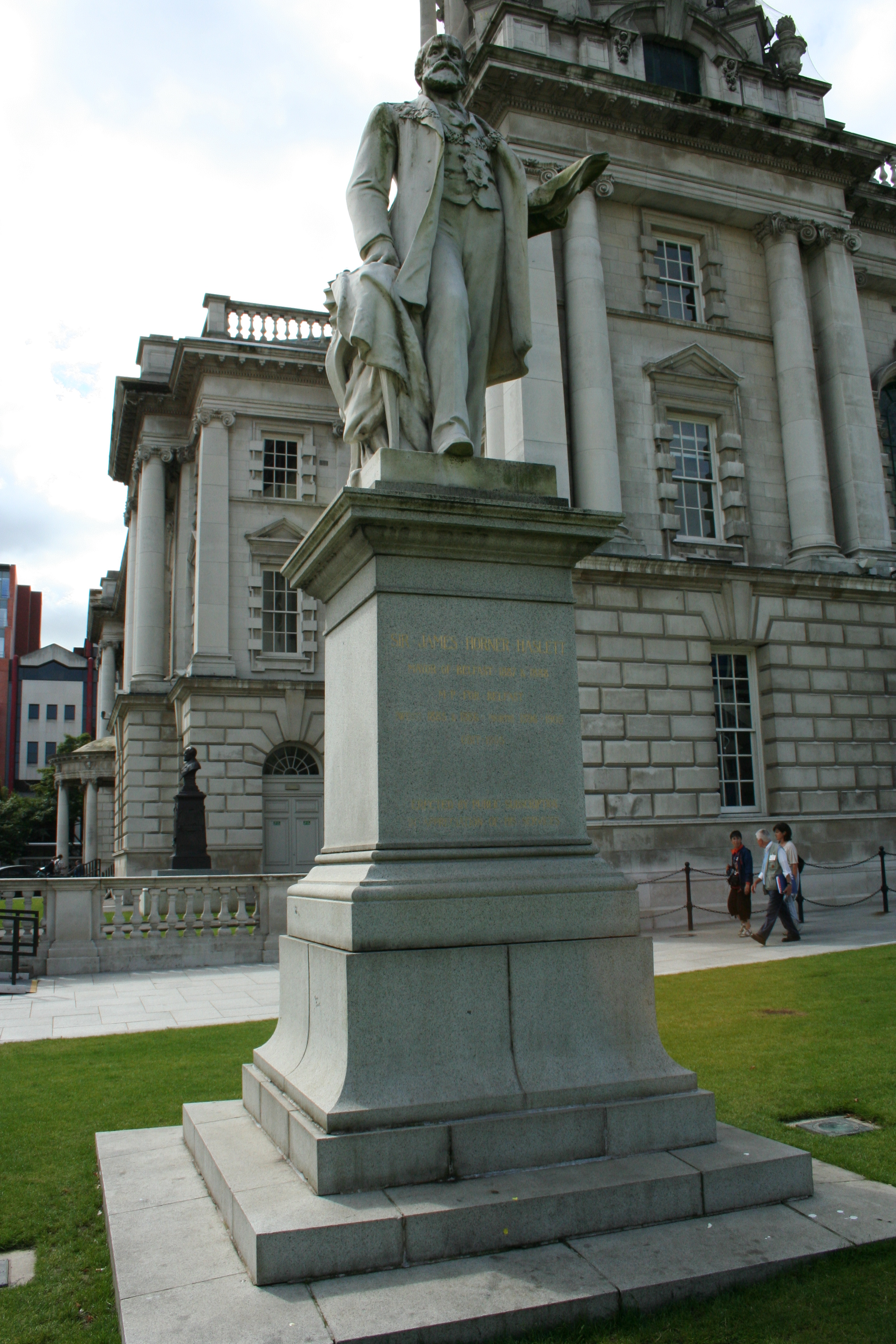
Statue of James Horner Haslett, Mayor of Belfast (1887–88)

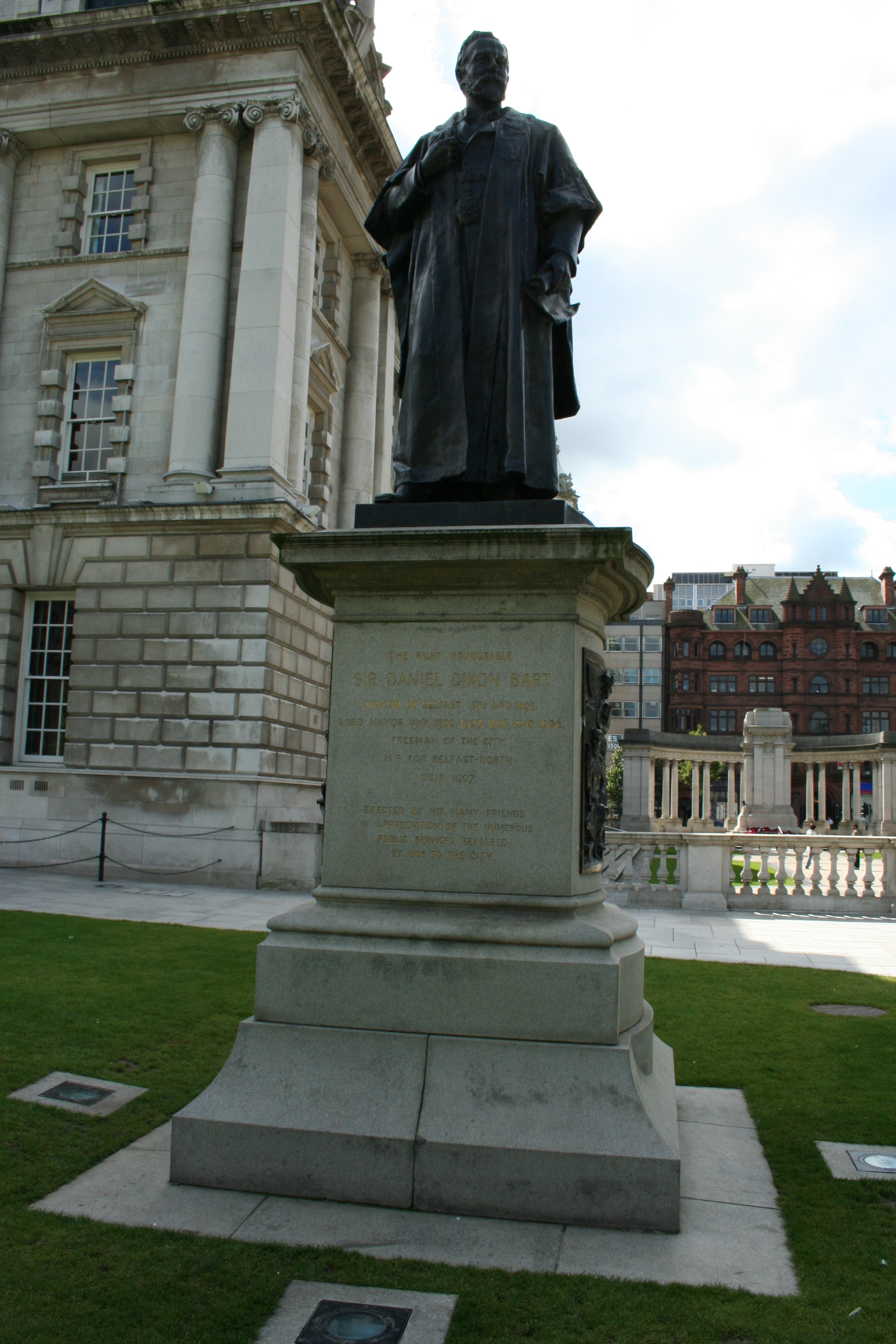
Statue of Sir Daniel Dixon, first Lord Mayor of Belfast (1892–93, 1901-04 & 1905–07)

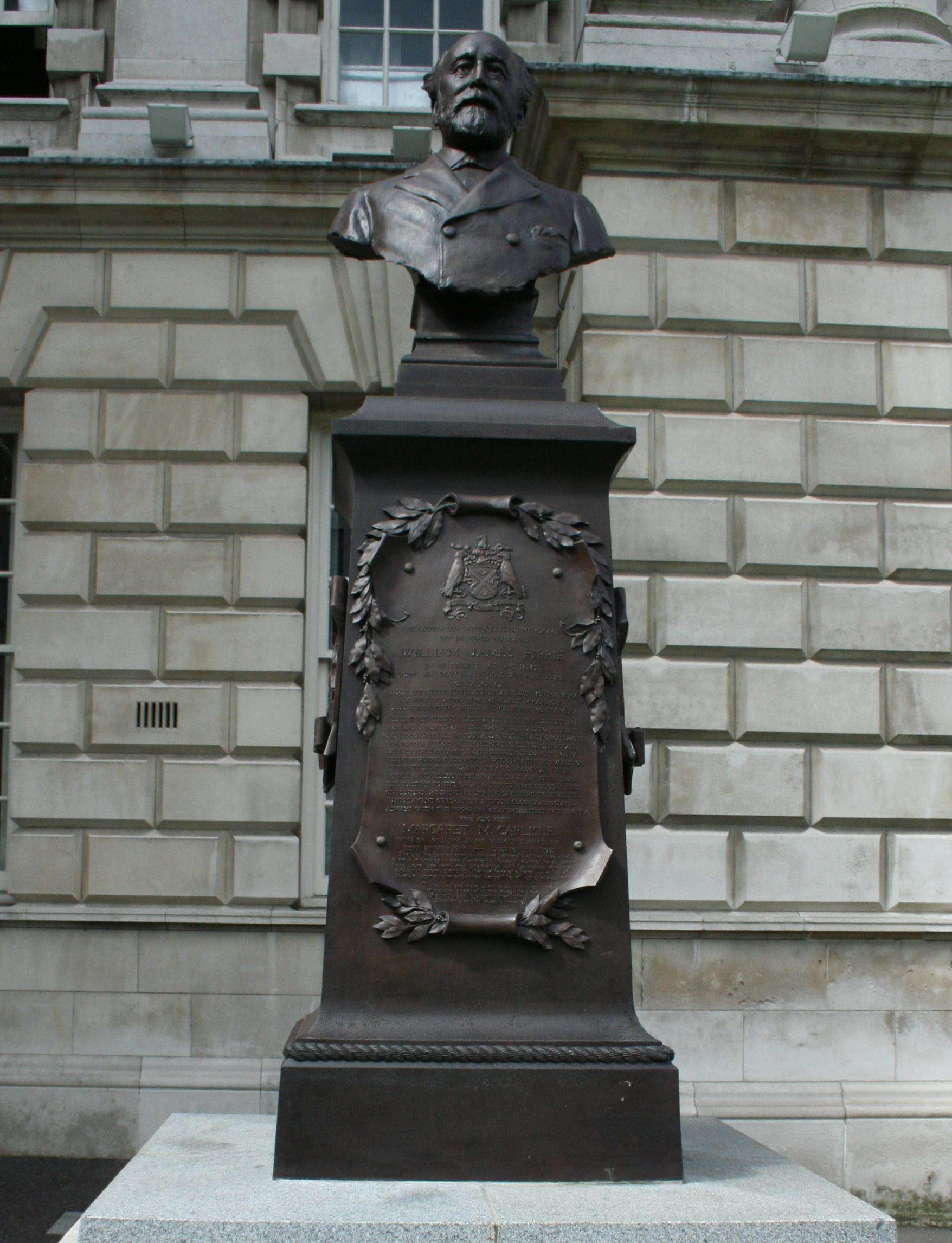
Statue of William James Pirrie, Lord Mayor of Belfast (1896–98)

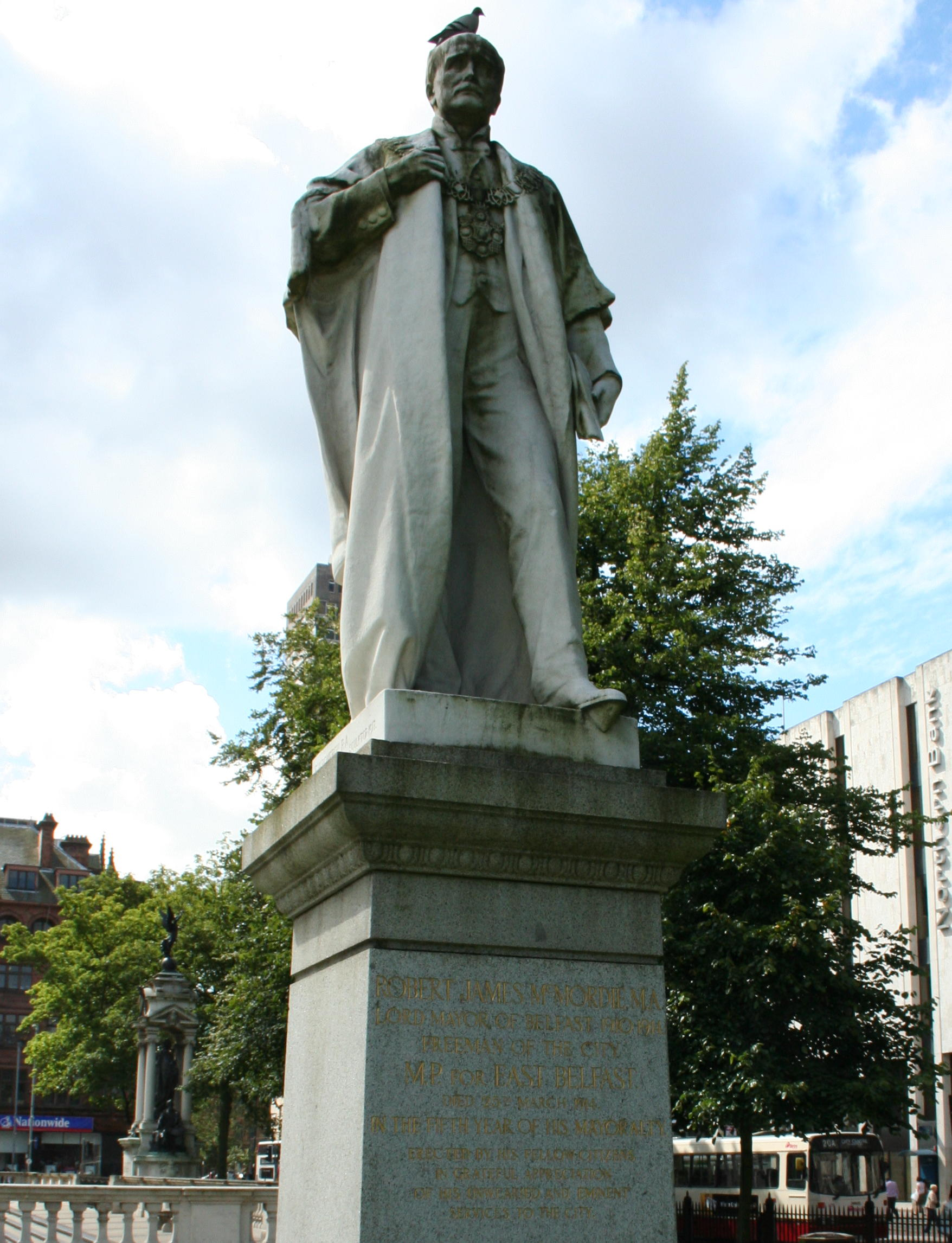
Statue of R. J. McMordie, Lord Mayor of Belfast (1910–14)

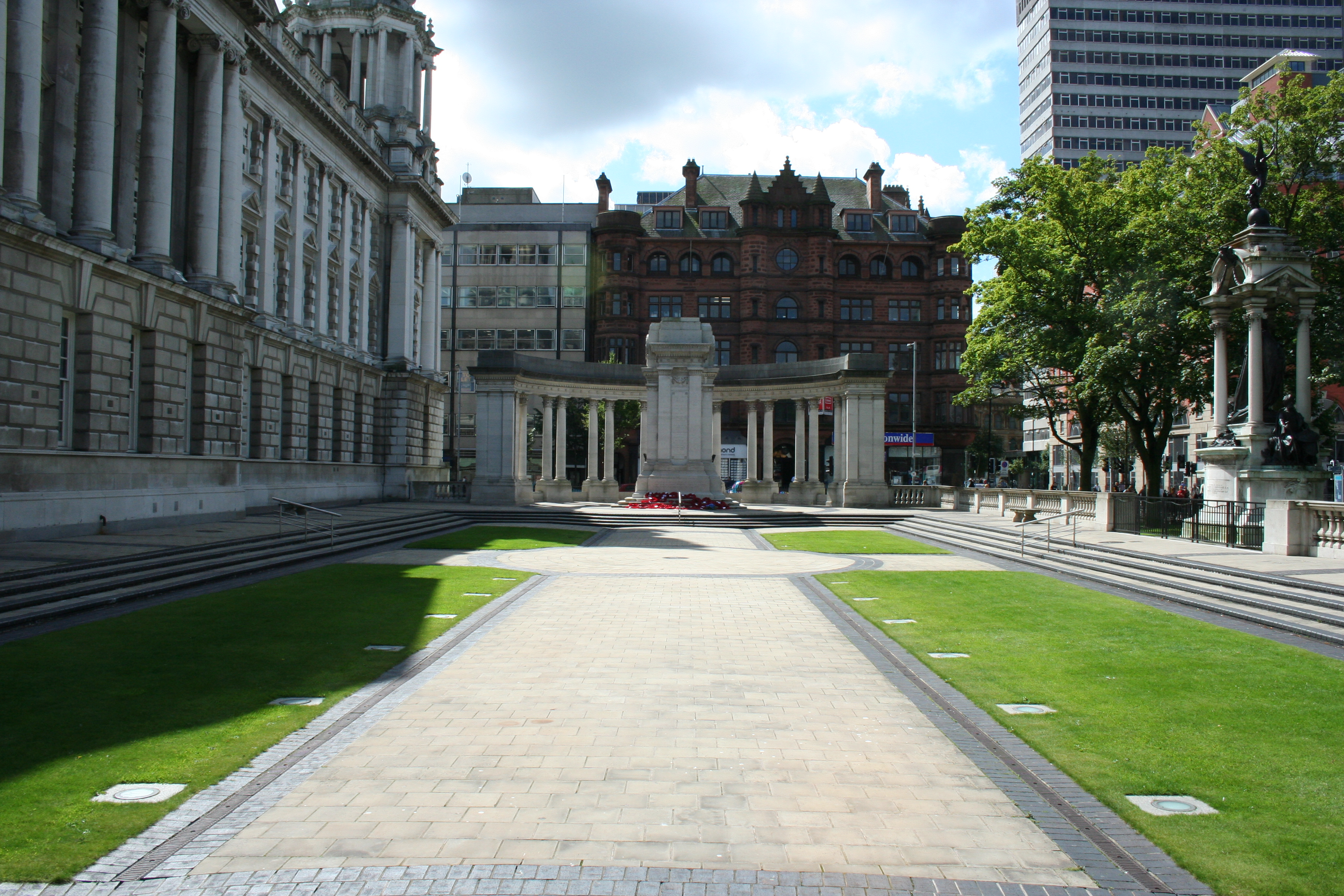
Garden of Remembrance and The Cenotaph in Belfast

== See also ==
- List of public art in Belfast

Preceded by none	Home of the Parliament of Northern Ireland; 1921	Succeeded by Assembly's College Building
