= Old Town Hall, Belfast =

Municipal Building in Belfast, Northern Ireland

Old Town Hall
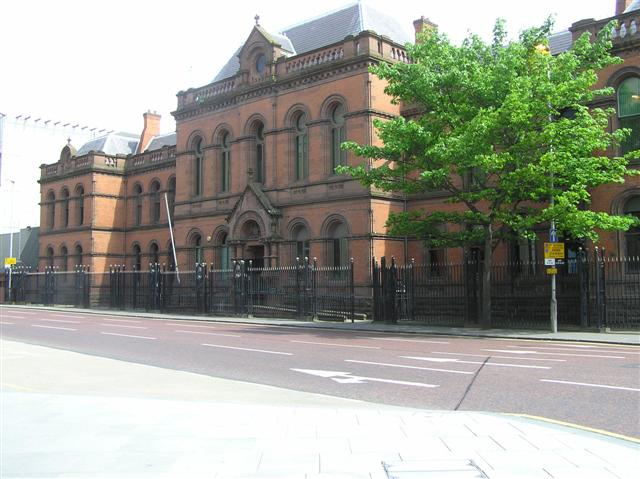
- Old Town Hall

- Shown in Northern Ireland
- 54.5979°N 5.9236°W
- Location: Victoria Street, Belfast

History
- Built: 1871

Site notes
- Architect: Anthony Jackson
- Architectural style: Italianate style

Listed Building – Grade B1
- Official name: Old Town Hall, 80 Victoria Street, Belfast
- Designated: 23 September 1977
- Reference no.: HB 26/50/044

The Old Town Hall is a municipal structure in Victoria Street, Belfast, Northern Ireland. The structure, which has most recently been used as courthouse, is a Grade B1 listed building.

== History ==
Following significant population growth, largely associated with the linen and rope-making industries, the town became a municipal borough in 1842. Council meetings were initially held in a small rented building in Victoria Square, which later became part of the premises of Cantrell & Cochrane. By the mid-19th century, the town council found this arrangement inadequate and decided to commission a purpose-built town hall. The site they selected was a former pork market in Victoria Street. The new building was designed by Anthony Jackson in the Italianate style, built by a local contractor, James Henry, in red brick with red sandstone dressings for £33,000 and was completed in 1871.

The design involved a symmetrical main frontage with nineteen bays facing onto Victoria Street, with the end blocks of three bays each projected forward as pavilions; the central section of five bays, which also projected forward, featured a central porch formed by two pairs of Ionic order columns supporting a gabled canopy. On either side of the central block, there were connecting blocks of four bays each. The building was fenestrated on both floors by round-headed windows with voussoirs and, at roof level, there was a balustraded parapet across the whole frontage. The central and end blocks featured moulded pediments containing oculi and these blocks were surmounted by mansard roofs. Internally, the principal rooms were the municipal offices, the recorder's courtroom and the police courtroom. The furniture was made of polished oak with green Morocco leather.

After Belfast was awarded city status by Queen Victoria in 1888, the new city leaders formed the view that the Victoria Street building was not imposing enough and decided to commission a new building in Donegall Square which opened in August 1906. The old town hall then became solely dedicated to the operation of the recorder's courtroom and the police courtroom. It briefly served as the premises of printers, David Allen & Sons, from 1910 to 1912, when it became the home of the newly formed Ulster Unionist Council: Sir Edward Carson presided over a meeting of the Ulster Unionist Council in the old town hall on 7 September 1912 at which it committed to signing the Ulster Covenant in protest at the Third Home Rule Bill. Carson also made the old town hall available for use as the barracks of the Ulster Volunteer Force under the command of Lieutenant General Sir George Richardson. Many members of the Ulster Volunteer Force were recruited for service in the 36th (Ulster) Division in the old town hall and were then deployed to the Western Front during the First World War.

After the war, the building continued to serve as the headquarters of the Ulster Unionist Party and then became the home of the Belfast Educational Committee in 1927. After suffering minor damage in the Belfast Blitz during the Second World War, it reverted to service as a courthouse, and briefly provided additional accommodation for Belfast Technology College between 1969 and 1977, before reverting to service as a courthouse again. It continued to be used as home to the local Youth, Family and Domestic Proceedings Court into the 21st century, although, by 2020, it was vacant.
