= Belfast bap =

Bread roll originating from Northern Ireland

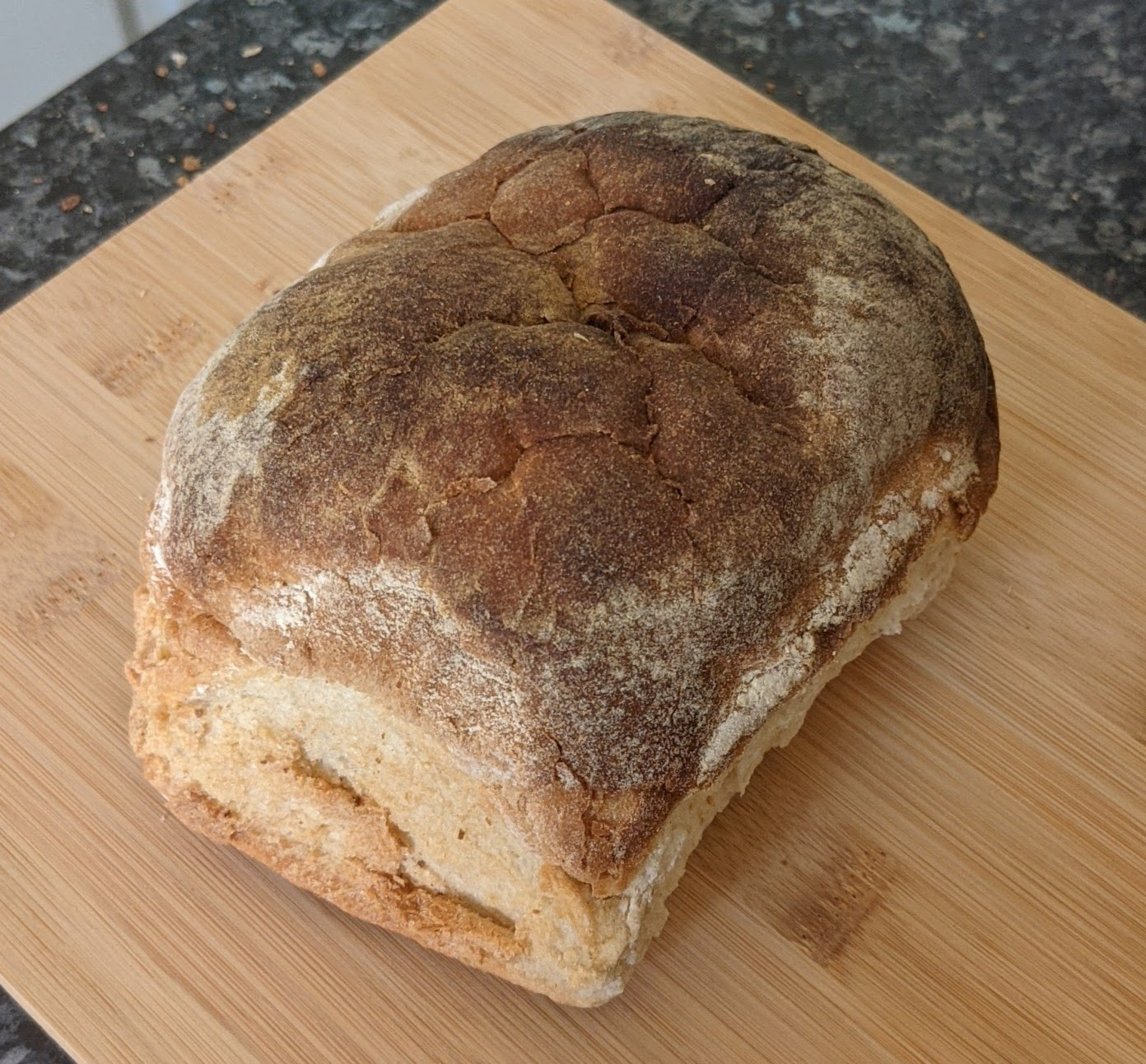
A Belfast bap

A Belfast bap is a large crusty white bread roll that originates from Belfast, Northern Ireland. It is best known today as the bread in a breakfast sandwich, but can be eaten as a regular sandwich bap.

The bread is noted for its size being around half a small pan loaf (150–200 g), airy, chewy soft white interior and a distinctive hard crust that is almost burnt on the top. It originates from master baker, Bernard Hughes, who created this bread to feed the poor of Belfast during the Great Famine.

The bread can be found in bakeries and supermarkets in and around the city of Belfast, but is fairly unknown outside of Northern Ireland.

== See also ==
- Cuisine of Ireland
- Cuisine of Northern Ireland
- List of bread rolls
- List of breads
- List of buns
