= Friar's Bush Graveyard =

Cemetery in Belfast, Northern Ireland

Coordinates: 54.5818°N 5.9350°W

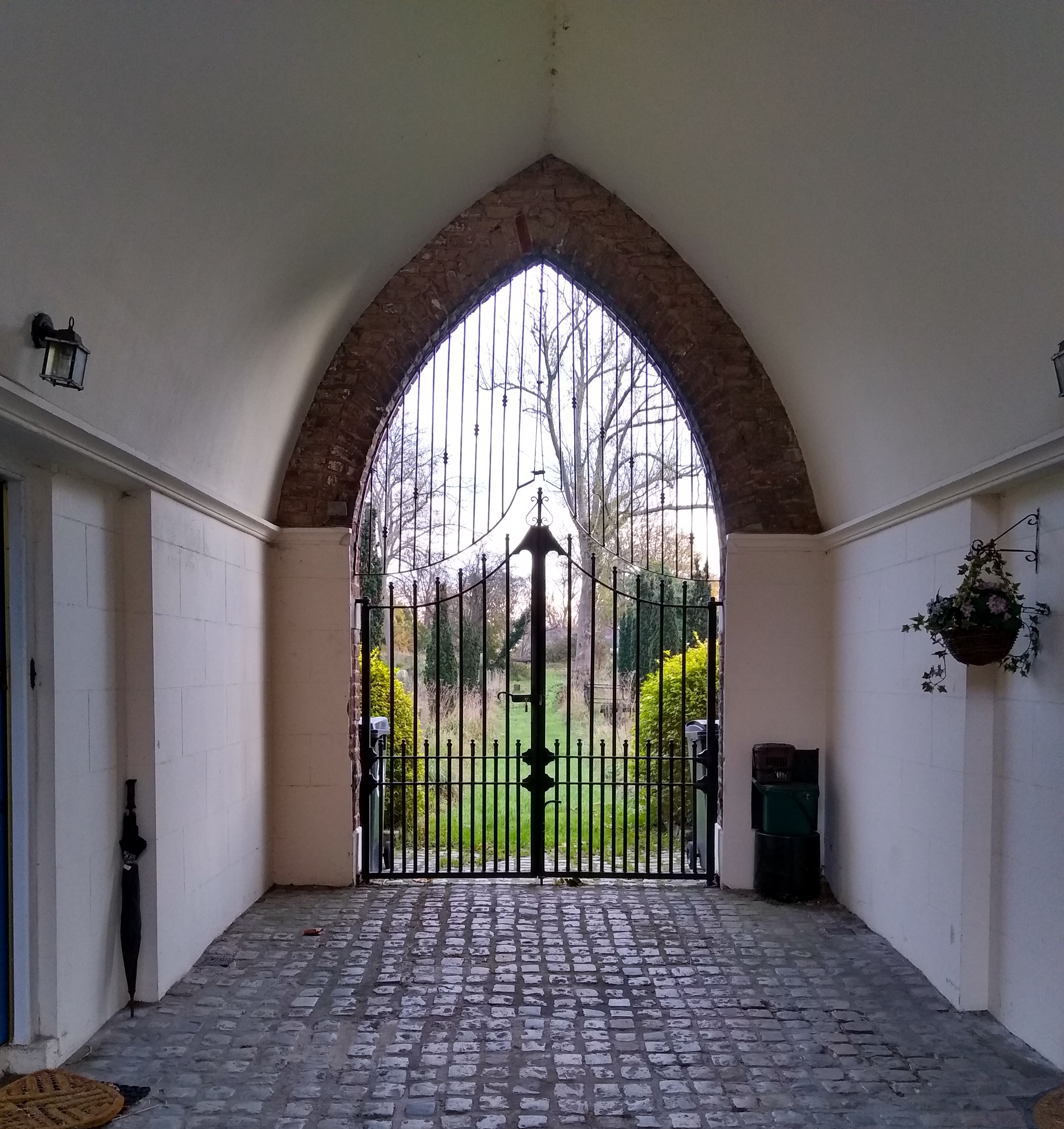
Friar's Bush Graveyard

Friar's Bush Graveyard is the oldest Christian burial site in the city of Belfast in Northern Ireland. A mound in the graveyard is believed to date from the Neolithic period. It is located on the Stranmillis Road in South Belfast. It had a B1 listed status.

Among the many trees found in the cemetery and ancient Irish yews, ash, maple and in the oldest part, chestnut.

The majority of the historic headstones are made from sandstone and have, according to an academic study in 1983, badly weathered or broken.

== History ==
Written evidence for the pre-Ulster Plantation history is hard to source, although there is some pictorial evidence or representation of the graveyard's location in a 1570 map. Today the site covers almost two acres and inside there is an obvious visual difference between the older part, furthest away from the Stranmillis Road, and a new section gifted in 1828 from the Marquis of Donegall to mark Catholic Emancipation.

The Belfast born poet Joseph Campbell wrote of the cemetery:

In Penal times, as peasents tell,
A friar came with book and bell
To chant his Mass each Sabbath morn,
Beneath Stranmillis trysting thorn.

== Famous burials ==
The oldest headstone in the cemetery was erected to the memory of Thomas Gibson who died in 1717. In the 1820s and 1830s the cemetery was occasionally targeted by body-snatchers. In 1823 the bodies of a woman and a child were stolen from the graveyard, although later returned.

The cemetery is the resting place of thousands of victims of the Cholera epidemic of the 1830s and the Great Irish famine of the 1840s. These people were buried in a mound dubbed 'Plaguey Hill', which is located just inside the cemetery's main gates. Also located inside the graveyard's main gates is the "Pauper's Pit", which is the resting place of those too poor to afford a headstone. By the mid-19th century, the cemetery was becoming overcrowded, and only families with burial rights were allowed to be interred, and in 1869 it was replaced by Milltown Cemetery as the city's main Catholic burial site.

The graveyard is the resting place of the famed baker and philanthropist Bernard (Barney) Hughes who died in 1878.

Andrew Joseph McKenna, the Cavan-born journalist who founded The Northern Star newspaper - a title chosen to evoke the more famous newspaper of the same name from the 18th century Northern Star (newspaper of the Society of United Irishmen) - to advance the liberal cause in Belfast was buried here in 1872. A large Gothic monument was later erected by public subscription.

The harpist Valentine Rennie, who played for King George IV in Dublin Castle in 1821, was buried in the cemetery in 1837.

== Twenty-first century and tourism ==
Since 2000 Friar's Bush has been maintained by the Belfast City Council, having previously been the property of the Roman Catholic Diocese of Down and Connor. An information board outside the cemetery contains some of the key historical elements of the story of the cemetery.

There are a variety of groups offering tours of the cemetery and committed to the preservation and enhancement of this historic site.

== See also ==
- Milltown Cemetery
- Shankill Graveyard
