= Prostitution in Northern Ireland =

Prostitution in Northern Ireland is governed by the Human Trafficking and Exploitation (Criminal Justice and Support for Victims) Act (Northern Ireland) 2015, which makes it illegal to pay for sex in Northern Ireland. Prior to the act coming into effect, prostitution in Northern Ireland was regulated by the same or similar laws to those in England and Wales, as it is elsewhere in the United Kingdom. At that time, prostitution in Northern Ireland was legal subject to a number of restraints which controlled certain activities associated with prostitution, such as soliciting, procuring, living on the proceeds of prostitution (pimping), exploitation of prostitutes, under-age prostitution, and keeping a brothel. However, devolution provided the opportunity for separate legislation in Northern Ireland.

== Nature and extent ==
As elsewhere, accurate figures for the extent of prostitution in Northern Ireland are difficult to ascertain, given the covert nature of the activities, although the police estimated 40–100 people were working in the sex trade in 2010. As in other countries, street prostitution has declined in favour of off-street prostitution. As with much of Europe, there appears to be a fair amount of mobility of prostitutes in and out of the territory, particularly in Belfast. While exact numbers are very hard to obtain, the 2014 research suggested between 300 and 350 people working on any particular day, the majority of whom were women, with the commonest age range being 25–30. The researchers found that under-age prostitutes were uncommon, and that most prostitutes did not start till they were of legal age.

== Research ==
Despite the publicity given to the issue, there has been a paucity of research on prostitution in Northern Ireland. The Department of Justice carried out its own research published in 2011, and in 2013, it commissioned a research study, which was carried out by the Queen's University Belfast, and released in October 2014 (Research into Prostitution in Northern Ireland). The findings were dismissed by supporters of the Human Trafficking Bill, in particular, Women's Aid and the DUP.

== Current laws ==
The legal framework is governed by Part 5 (Ss. 58–64) of the Sexual Offences (Northern Ireland) Order 2008 (S.I. 2008/1769 (N.I. 2)), as amended by the Policing and Crime Act 2009 (on 1 April 2010). These create offences for loitering or soliciting in a street or public place for prostitution (S. 59), soliciting from a motor vehicle (kerb crawling) (S. 60), organising, advertising, or recruiting into prostitution for the purposes of gain (S. 62), controlling a prostitute (S. 63), or keeping a brothel (defined as more than one person selling sexual services in a given location) (S. 64).

=== Soliciting ===
The Policing and Crime Act 2009 (S. 20) replaced Ss 60–61 of the Sexual Offences (Northern Ireland) Order 2008 dealing with soliciting by a new offence, S. 60 "Soliciting":

(1) It is an offence for a person in a street or public place to solicit another (B) for the purpose of obtaining B's sexual services as a prostitute.
(2) The reference to a person in a street or public place includes a person in a vehicle in a street or public place.

(3) A person guilty of an offence under this Article shall be liable on summary conviction to a fine not exceeding level 3 on the standard scale.

=== Exploitation ===
The Policing and Crime Act 2009 (S. 15) created a new offence by amending the Sexual Offences (Northern Ireland) Order 2008 to include S. 64A "Paying for sexual services of a prostitute subjected to force etc.":

(1)A person (A) commits an offence if—

(a)A makes or promises payment for the sexual services of a prostitute (B),
(b)a third person (C) has engaged in exploitative conduct of a kind likely to induce or encourage B to provide the sexual services for which A has made or promised payment, and
(c)C engaged in that conduct for or in the expectation of gain for C or another person (apart from A or B).

(2) The following are irrelevant—

(a) where in the world the sexual services are to be provided and whether those services are provided,.
(b) whether A is, or ought to be, aware that C has engaged in exploitative conduct.

(3) C engages in exploitative conduct if—

(a) C uses force, threats (whether or not relating to violence) or any other form of coercion, or.
(b) C practises any form of deception.

(4) A person guilty of an offence under this Article shall be liable on summary conviction to a fine not exceeding level 3 on the standard scale.

=== Purchasing sex ===
Influenced by policies in Sweden, the Democratic Unionist Party Peer Maurice Morrow successfully campaigned for the criminalisation of purchasing sex in Northern Ireland. The Northern Ireland Assembly voted in Morrow's private members bill, Human Trafficking and Exploitation (Further Provisions and Support for Victims) Bill. On 1 June 2015 the resulting Human Trafficking and Exploitation (Criminal Justice and Support for Victims) Act (Northern Ireland) 2015 was introduced. While prostitution was only one element of the Act, the Act also stated that soliciting and loitering were no longer offences and that a programme of support would be offered to those exiting prostitution. Clients would be subject to a maximum penalty of one year in prison and a fine of £1000.

== Organisations ==
Ugly Mugs Ireland is a not-for-profit technology initiative that aims to improve the safety of sex workers in Ireland and the UK and reduce crimes committed against them, by bringing sex workers together to share information about potential dangers.

== See also ==
- History of Ireland
- List of political parties in Northern Ireland
- Northern Ireland Assembly
- Parliament of Northern Ireland
- Prostitution in the United Kingdom

== Bibliography ==
- Let's talk about sex work...in Northern Ireland. Helen McBride, Nursing Clio January 9 2014
