= List of cenotaphs in Northern Ireland =

Various cenotaphs have been erected in Northern Ireland: the UK National Inventory of War Memorials provides comprehensive details of each monument in their Online Database (links provided). A private website also maintains very detailed information on a number of these monuments.

Most communities in Northern Ireland can account for losses in the conflicts of the 19th and 20th centuries especially the World Wars. To honour those that died, it was common practice for communities to contribute toward a fund to build a memorial or cenotaph. These cenotaphs are often quite striking and frequently the only decorative or sculptural structures to be seen in smaller settlements. Such cenotaphs are rarely the only memorial erected by a community: stained glass windows, plaques and similar artifacts can be found in churches and other public buildings. Indeed, often buildings themselves, especially British Legion Halls, or gardens were constructed as memorials too.

County	Community	Location	Year	List of Names	Description	Notes	Image
Down	Bangor	Ward Park	1927	133	Bangor Cenotaph: Portland stone obelisk with bronze figures		
Down	Bangor	Ward Park			Bronze deck-gun recovered from a captured German U-boat bearing the inscription "This gun taken from German submarine UB19 was allotted to Bangor (County Down) by the Admiralty in recognition of the valorous conduct of Commander the Hon. Edward Barry Stewart Bingham of H.M.S. Nestor at the Battle of Jutland on 31st May 1916. For which he received the Victoria Cross."		
Down	Holywood	Redburn Square	1922	108, 26, 1	Holywood War Memorial: Bronze soldier with rifle & bayonet upon a marble plinth (plinth and surrounding stonework whitewashed)		
Down	Newtownards	Old Bowling Green	1934	316	Newtownards War Memorial: Granite obelisk on a four stepped base		
Down	Waringstown	beside church	1921	?	Waringstown Memorial Clock: a 40-foot clock tower built from local stone with 3 dial chiming clock		
Antrim	County Antrim	Knochagh Hill, Monument Road	1922–1937		Knockagh Monument: an obelisk 110 feet in height set and a site 935 feet above Belfast Lough; modeled on the Wellington Memorial in Phoenix Park, Dublin. The monument dominates the skyline above Carrickfergus and Greenisland and is clearly visible from across the lough in North Down		
Antrim	Glengormley	Glengormley Park, Ballyclare Road	1990		Glengormley Memorial: 3.5m red marble obelisk on two brick steps		
Antrim	Jordanstown	Loughshore Park, Shore Road	1983		Jordanstown Memorial: 1.7m Free-standing tablet of polished granite		
Antrim	Belfast	In the car park of Belfast Borough Council, Translink Railway Workshops, York St, Belfast - no public access. Previously in the Carrickfergus railway station car park and originally in York Road Railway Station, Belfast (now demolished) – relocated to Carrickfergus in 1993	1921	60, 8	Midland Railway & Northern Counties Committee Memorial: an ornate stone obelisk on a square plinth with bronze name plaques; erected by Midland Railway Company		
Antrim	Larne	Inver Park near parish church	1922	147	Larne War Memorial: Bronze soldier and sailor on a 5 m Portland stone obelisk		
Antrim	Belfast	Originally constructed near the battlefield (Battle of Happy Valley) at Chaegunghyon, Korea: in 1962 moved to Royal Ulster Rifles barracks in Ballymena and in 2008 to the grounds of Belfast City Hall when the barracks closed	1951	208	Known as the Imjin River Memorial; Korean granite obelisk on a two-stepped plinth; with bronze additions in 2008		
Antrim	Belfast	In an enclosure on the East side of Belfast City Hall, formerly on the NE corner of the grounds	1905	132	Boer War Memorial, Belfast: an 8-foot bronze soldier in khaki uniform at the ready with rifle and bayonet upon a massive boulder set on a granite plinth (15-foot); dedicated to the Royal Irish Rifles		
Antrim	Belfast	West side of Belfast City Hall			Belfast Cenotaph: In a sunken garden separated by a semicircle of Corinthian columns as a backdrop to a large Portland stone obelisk; the area repaved in 1993		
